Historical accounts for early U.S. naval history now occur across the spectrum of two and more centuries. This Bibliography lends itself primarily to reliable sources covering early U.S. naval history beginning around the American Revolution period on through the 18th and 19th centuries and includes sources which cover notable naval commanders, Presidents, important ships, major naval engagements and corresponding wars. The bibliography also includes sources that are not committed to the subject of U.S. naval history per se but whose content covers this subject extensively.

Among the contemporary and earlier historical accounts are primary sources, historical accounts, often derived from letters, dispatches, government and military records, captain's logs and diaries, etc., written by authors who were involved in or closely associated to the historical episode in question. Primary source material is often collected, compiled and published by other editors also, sometimes many years after the historical subject has passed. Many of the authors are notable and even famous in their own right and are linked to their corresponding biographies.

General naval history

 
 
 Allen, Gardner W. (1909). Our Naval War with France.
Houghton Miffn Publishers, New York. p. 323,  E'book

 Blanchard, Amos (1832). American military & naval biography:...Salisbury, Cincinnati, p. 604, E'book
 Bradford, James C. (1955). Quarterdeck and bridge: two centuries of American naval leaders.
Naval Institute Press, 1997. p. 455, . Book (par view)

 Braynard, Frank Osborn, (1956). Famous American ships: being an historical sketch of the United States as told through its maritime life,
Hastings House, p.207, Book (snippit view)

 Canney, Donald L. (2001). Sailing warships of the US Navy.
Chatham Publishing / Naval Institute Press. p. 224. , Book (par view)

 Chapelle, Howard I. (1998). The History of the American Sailing Navy: The Ships and Their Development
Konecky & Konecky, p. 592, Book (snippit view)

 —— (1935). The history of American sailing ships, Volume 46
 W. W. Norton & company, p. 400, Book (snippit view)

 Chesneau, Roger; Koleśnik, Eugène M.; Campbell, N. J. M.; (1979). Conway's All the World's Fighting Ships 1860–1905, Conway Maritime Press, 440 pages, Book (no view)
 Clark, George Ramsey; Stevens, William Oliver; Alden, Carroll Storrs; Krafft, Herman FrederickA Short History of the United States NavyJ. B. Lippincott Company, p. 503, E'book, 1911 edition, E'book, 1927 revised edition
 Coggeshall, George (1856). History of the American privateers, and letters-of-marque: ... G.Coggeshall;
C.T.Evans, Agent. New York. p. 438, E'book

 Cooper, James Fenimore (1846). Lives of distinguished American naval officers ... ,
 Carey and Hart, Philadelphia.. p. 436. OCLC 620356, E'book

 —— (1864).History of the Navy of the United States of America: Continued to 1860 ..., Volumes 1-3Blakeman & Mason, p. 634, E'book
 Coletta, Paolo Enrico (1981). A Bibliography of American Naval HistoryNaval Institute Press, p. 453, Book (no view)
 —— (1856). History of the navy of the United States of America.
Stringer & Townsend, New York. p. 508. OCLC 197401914, E'book

Cross, Wilbur (1960). Naval battles and heroesAmerican Heritage Pub. Co, p. 153, Book (snippit view)

 Daughan, George C. (2008). If By Sea: The Forging of the American Navy--from the Revolution to the War of 1812
Basic Books; New York. p. 576, Book

 Dept U.S.Navy. "Ships Histories Dictionary of American Naval Fighting Ships". Dictionary of American Naval Fighting Ships.
DEPARTMENT OF THE NAVY—NAVAL HISTORICAL CENTER. Retrieved 1 November 2011, Book

 Dept U.S.Navy, "Dictionary of American Naval Fighting Ships : DANFS,
 DEPARTMENT OF THE NAVY - NAVAL HISTORICAL CENTER.

 Donovan, Frank Robert (1962). The tall frigates. Dodd, Mead; Original, Univ. Wisconsin. p.23, Book (snippit view)
 Dorwart, Jeffery M.; Wolf, Jean K. (2001). The Philadelphia Navy Yard: From the Birth of the U.S. Navy to the Nuclear Age.
University of Pennsylvania Press. p.271, .  Book (no view)

 Dresel, H.G., (1896), United States Naval Institute Proceedings, Volume 22(Naval warfare, tactics, weapons, etc.,) United States Naval Institute, Annapolis p.866, E'book
 Dull, Jonathan R. (2012). American Naval History, 1607-1865: Overcoming the Colonial Legacy,
Univ of Nebraska Press, p.216, Book (par view)

 Emmons, George Foster, Lieut. U.S.N. (1853). The navy of the United States, from the commencement, 1775 to 1853: with a brief history of each vessel's service and fate as appears upon record Gideon & Co., Washington, p. 208, E'book
 Fink, Leo Gregory (1962). Barry or Jones, "Father of the United States Navy"; Historical Reconnaissance
 Jefferies & Manz, Inc, Philadelphia. p. 554,  Book (snippit view)

 Folsom, Benjamin (2012). A Compilation of Biographical Sketches of Distinguished Officers in the American Navy.
Gale, Sabin Americana. p. 192, . E'book

 —— (1984).  Jack tars and commodores: the American Navy, 1783-1815
Houghton Mifflin, p. 318, Book (snippit view)

 Franklin, Walter, (1961). Famous American ships: from the discovery of the New World to the Battle of Manila Bay,
Golden Press, p.54, Book (snippit view)

 Frost, John, (1852). Universal naval history: comprising the naval operations of the principal maritime nations of the world, from the earliest period to the present time H.E
Robins and Company, New York, p. 608, E'book

 —— (2009). (Orig:1844) American Naval Biography
E.H. Butler, Philadelphia, p. 432, E'book

  Gillmer, Thomas,  (1997). Old Ironsides,
International Marine/Ragged Mountain Press, p.239, Book

 Goldsborough, Charles Washington  (1824), The United States' Naval Chronicle, James Wilson, Washington, p. 395, E'book
 Hagan, Kenneth J., (1984), In Peace and War: Interpretations of American Naval History, 1775-1984,
Greenwood Press, p. 395, Book

 —— (1992). This People's Navy: The Making of American Sea Power
The Free Press, New York. p. 468. , Book

 Hamersly, Lewis Randolph  (1901), List of officers of the Navy of the United States and of the Marine Corps, from 1775 to 1900 L.R. Hamersly & Co, New York, p. 749, E'book
 Harbeck, Charles Thomas; Doyle, Agnes C., Ed.; (1906). A contribution to the bibliography of the history of the United States navyPriv. print. at the Riverside press, Cambridge, p. 247, E'book
 Harrison, Henry William (1858). Battlefields and naval exploits of the United States: ...,
 H. C. Peck & Theo. Bliss, Philadelphia. p. 448,  E'book

 Hattendorf, John B. (2007). The Oxford Encyclopedia of Maritime History
Oxford University Press, 4 volume set, Book (no view)

 Hibben, Henry B.; United States. Navy Dept (1890). Navy-yard, Washington: History from organization, 1799, to present date.
Govt. Print. Office. p. 240, E'book

 Howarth, Stephen (1999). To Shining Sea: A History of the United States Navy, 1775-1998,
University of Oklahoma Press. p. 630. ,  Book (par view)

 James, William, (1826), The naval history of Great Britain...Volume 1, Harding, Lepard and Co., London, p. 567, E'book
 —— (1822), The naval history of Great Britain...Volume 2, Baldwin, Cradock and Joy, London p. 646, E'book
 —— (1837), The naval history of Great Britain...Volume 3, Richard Bentley, London, p. 386, E'book
 —— (1824), The naval history of Great Britain...Volume 4, Baldwin, Chadock and Joy, London, p. 500, E'book
 —— (1847/1859), The naval history of Great Britain...Volume 5, Richard Bentley, London, p. 458, E'book
 —— (1837), The naval history of Great Britain...Volume 6, Richard Bentley, London, p. 458, E'book
 Johnson, Robert Erwin (1964). Thence Round Cape Horn: The Story of United States Naval Forces on Pacific Station, 1818-1923
 Annapolis: Naval Institute Press. p. 276. , Book

 Judson, Clara Ingram (1943). Donald McKay: Designer of Clipper ShipsCharles Scribner's Sons, New York, p. 136, Book
 Kimball, Horace (1858). The Naval Battles of the United States in the Different Wars with Foreign Nations, from the Commencement of the Revolution to the Present Time: Including PrivateeringHiggins, Bradley and Dayton, Boston, p. 278, E'book
 Labaree Benjamin W.; Fowler, William M.; Hattendorf, John; Sloan, Edward; Safford Jeffrey; German, Andrew (1998)
America and The Sea: A Maritime History,
 Mystic Seaport publications, p. 686, Book

 Lavery, Brian  (1984), The Ship of the Line: The development of the battlefleet 1650-1850, Conway Maritime Press, p. 224, Book
 Leeman, William P. (2010). The Long Road to Annapolis: The Founding of the Naval Academy and the Emerging American Republic,
 Univ of North Carolina Press. p. 292. , Book

 McBride, James (1815). Naval biography: consisting of memoirs of the most distinguished officers of the American navy; to which is annexed the life of General Pike,
 Morgan, Williams & co., Cincinnati, p. 296, E'book

 McMaster, John Bach (1914) A History of the People of the United States: 1803-1812.
D. Appleton and company, New York & London.. p. 590. Book

 Mahan, Alfred Thayer (1890), The influence of sea power upon history, 1660-1783
 Malcomson, Robert (2001), Warships of the Great Lakes, 1754-1834,  Chatham, p. 160, Book
Morison, Samuel Eliot. (1967) "Old Bruin": Commodore Matthew C. Perry, 1794-1858: The American naval officer who helped found Liberia, Hunted Pirates in the West Indies, Practised Diplomacy With the Sultan of Turkey and the King of the Two Sicilies; Commanded the Gulf Squadron in the Mexican War, Promoted the Steam Navy and the Shell Gun, and Conducted the Naval Expedition Which Opened Japan (1967)  pp 61–76 online free to borrow 
 Moore, James  (1984), Building the Wooden Fighting Ship, Facts On File, Incorporated, p. 128, Book
 Morris, James M.; Kearns,  Patricia M. (2011). Historical Dictionary of the United States NavyScarecrow Press, p. 570, Book
 Miller, Nathan (1997). The U.S. Navy: A History (3rd ed.)
 Annapolis, MD: Naval Institute Press. . OCLC 37211290, Book

 —— (2005). Broadsides: The Age of Fighting Sail, 1775-1815,
 Wiley Book Sales, p. 388, Book

 Paine, Lincoln P. (1997). Ships of the world: an historical encyclopedia,
 Houghton Mifflin Co., p. 680, 9780395715567, Book

 —— (2000). Ships of Discovery and Exploration,
 Houghton Mifflin Harcourt, p. 188, 9780395984154. Book

 —— (2000). Warships of the world to 1900,
 Houghton Mifflin Harcourt, New York, NY. p. 266. . Book

 Paullin, Charles Oscar (1906). The navy of the American Revolution: its administration, its policy and its achievements 
The Burrows Brothers Co. / Republican Printing Co., Iowa. p. 549, E'book

 Peterson, Charles Jacobs (1857) The American navy: being an authentic history of the United States navy ...
Jas. B. Smith & Co, Philadelphia. p. 545, E'book

 Preble, George Henry (N) (1870). The First Cruise of the United States Frigate Essex: With a Short Account of Her Origin, and Subsequent Career Until Captured by the British in 1814, and Her Ultimate Fate, Essex Institute, p. 108, E'book
 —— (1892). History of the United States Navy-yard, Portsmouth, N. H., U.S. Government Printing Office, Washington, p. 219, E'book
 Scott, Robert Nicholson; Lazelle, Henry Martyn; Davis, George Breckenridge  (1891). The War of the Rebellion: v.1-53 [serial no. 1-111] Formal reports, both Union and Confederate, of the first seizures of United States property in the southern states ...U.S. Government Printing Office, p. 807, E'book
 Silverstone, Paul (2012). The Sailing Navy, 1775-1854,
 Routledge, p. 112. , Book

 Smith, Joshua M. (2009). Voyages, the age of sail: documents in American maritime history. 1492-1865University Press of Florida, p. 396, Book (snippit view)
 Sondhaus, Lawrence (2001). Naval Warfare 1815–1914,
 Taylor & Francis. p. 272. . OCLC 44039349, Book

 Spears, John Randolph; Chamier, Frederick (1899). The history of our navy :  from its origin to the end of the war with Spain, 1775-1898, Volume 4.
Charles Scribner's Sons, New York. p. 526, Book

 Stevens, William Oliver; Westcott, Allan Ferguson (1920), A History of Sea Power, George H. Doran Company, New York. p. 428, E'book
 Sweetman, Jack (2002). American Naval History: An Illustrated Chronology of the U.S. Navy and Marine Corps, 1775–present,
 Naval Institute Press, Annapolis, MD:. . Book

 Toll, Ian W. (2006). Six Frigates: The Epic History of the Founding of the U.S. Navy.,
 W. W. Norton & Company, New York. p. 592. . Book

 Tucker, Glenn (1963). Dawn like thunder: the Barbary wars and the birth of the U. S. Navy,
 Bobbs-Merrill; Original, Univ. Michigan. p. 487, Book (snippit view)

 Tucker, Spencer C.  (1988). Arming the Fleet. U.S. Ordnance in the Muzzle-Loading Era,
 Naval Institute Press, p. 308, Book

 Wiley, Edwin; Rines, Irving Everett; Hart, Albert Bushnell (1916). Lectures on the growth and development of the United States: illustrated, Volume 5., 
 American Educational Alliance. p. 493, Book

 Wilentz, Sean (2005). The Rise of American Democracy. W.W. Norton & Company, New York, NY, 2006. , Book
 Williams, Greg H. (1824). The French assault on American shipping, 1793-1813:. McFarland & Company, North Carolina, London. p. 536. , Book
 United States Navy Dept, Bureau of Naval Personnel,  (1853). (P) Register of commissioned and warrant officers of the United States Navy and Marine Corps and reserve officers on active duty,
 United States, Bureau of Naval Personnel, p. 140, Book

 United States Navy (1901). (P) Papers of William Vernon and the Navy board, 1776-1794.
Board of the Eastern Dept, William Vernon, Rhode Island Historical Society (1901),  Snow & Farnham, printers, Providence. p. 81, Book

 United States. Navy Dept. Bureau of Navigation (1918). Navy directory: officers of the United States Navy and Marine Corps,
Govt. Printing Office.. p. 188, Book

American Revolution ~ Continental Navy

 Allen, Gardner Weld (1913). A naval history of the American Revolution, Volume 1 
Houghton Mifflin Company, New York. p. 365, Book (snippit view)

 —— (1922). Captain Hector McNeill of the Continental navy,
Massachusetts Historical Society, Boston: (Original printing Harvard University Press)  p. 108, E'book

 —— (1927). Massachusetts privateers of the revolution,
The Massachusetts historical society. p. 356, Book (no view)

 Barnes, Ian; Royster, Charles, (2000). The Historical Atlas of the American Revolution,
Psychology Press. p. 208, Book (par view)

 Beattie, Donald W.; Collins J. Richard (1969). Washington's New England fleet: Beverly's role in its origins, 1775-77Newcomb & Gauss Co, p. 69, Book
 Bowen-Hassell, E. Gordon; Conrad, Dennis Michael; Hayes, Mark L. (2003).Sea Raiders of the American Revolution: The Continental Navy in European Waters,
Government Printing. p. 73. , Book (par view)

 Buel, Richard, Jr. (1998). In Irons: Britain's Naval Supremacy and the American Revolutionary Economy,
Yale University Press,. p. 416. , Book

 Clark, William Bell (1949). Captain Dauntless: The Story of Nicholas Biddle of the Continental Navy,
Louisiana State University Press, p. 319, Book (no view)

—— (1956). Ben Franklin's Privateers: A Naval Epic of the American RevolutionState Univ. Press, Baton Rouge: Louisiana, p. 198, Book (snippit view)
—— (1960) George Washington's Navy: Being an Account of His Excellency's Fleet in New England Waters Louisiana State Univ. Press, Baton Rouge, p. 275. Book (snippit view)
 Coggins, Jack (2002.) Ships and Seamen of the American Revolution: Vessels, Crews, Weapons, Gear, Naval Tactics, and Actions of the War for Independence,
Courier Dover Publications. p. 224, Book (par view)

 Eastman, Ralph M. (2004). Some Famous Privateers of New England, 
Kessinger Publishing, LLC. p. 96, Book

 Gough, John Francis  (1946). Admiral de Grasse and American Independence, 
Indiana University Press, p. 45, Book

 Field, Edward (1898). Esek Hopkins, commander-in-chief of the continental navy during the American Revolution, 1775 to 1778: master mariner, politician, brigadier general, naval officer and philanthropist, 
Preston & Rounds Co., Providence. p. 280, E'book

 Fowler, William M. (1976)  Rebels under sail: the American Navy during the Revolution
Charles Scribner and Sons, New York, p. 356, Book

 Fredriksen, John C. (2006). Revolutionary War Almanac, 
Infobase Publishing, p.762, Url

 Hattendorf, John B. (N) (2011). The Formation and Roles of the Continental Navy, 1775-1785, in Talking About Naval History: A Collection of Essays,  
Naval War College Press, Newport, p. 354.  , Url

 Jackson, John W. (1974). The Pennsylvania Navy, 1775-1781: The Defense of the DelawareRutgers Univ. Press, New Brunswick, p. 514 , Url
 James, Hartwell (1899). Military heroes of the United States from Lexington to Santiago, 
Henry Altemus Co., Philadelphia. p. 218, E'book

James, William Milbourne (1926). The British Navy in Adversity: A Study of the War of American Independence, 
Longmans, Green and Co., Ltd, London, p. 459, Url

 Jennings, John (1966). Tattered Ensign The Story of America's Most Famous Fighting Frigate, U.S.S. Constitution,  
Thomas Y. Crowell, New York, p. 290, OCLC =1291484

Knox, Dudley Wright (1932). The Naval Genius of George Washington,  
Houghton Mifflin, Boston, p. 135, Ebook

 Lardas, Mark (2012). Ships of the American Revolutionary Navy, 
 Osprey Publishing. p. 161. , Url

 Lenge, Edward G. l (2012). A Companion to George Washington,
 John Wiley & Sons, UK. p. 640. , Url

Lewis, Charles Lee (1945). Admiral de Grasse and American Independence,United States Naval Institute, Annapolis, p. 404, Url
Lundeberg, Philip K. (1966). The Continental Gunboat Philadelphia and the Northern Campaign of 1776Smithsonian Institution, Washington. Url
 Lynch, Barbara A. (1976). The war at sea: France and the American Revolution : a bibliographyNaval History Division, Dept. of the Navy, p. 48, Url
Maclay, Edgar S. (1899). A History of American PrivateersD. Appleton and Company, New York, p. 519, E'book
 Mahan, Alfred Thayer (N) (1913). The Major Operations of the Navies in the War of American Independence  
Little Brown & Co., Boston, p. 280, E'Book

 McKee, Christopher  (1991). A Gentlemanly and Honorable Profession: The Creation of the U.S. Naval Officer Corps, 1794-1815, 
Naval Institute Press, p. 600, Url

 McManemin, John A. (1981). Captains of the Continental Navy,
 Ho-Ho-Kus Publishing Company. p. 576, Url

Middlebrook, Louis F. (1925). History of Maritime Connecticut During the American Revolution, 1775-1783, 2 vols.Essex Institute, Salem, Mass, p. 631 Vol.1, Vol.2
 Miller, Nathan (1974) Sea of glory: the Continental Navy fights for independence, 1775-1783, 
D. McKay Co.; Original from Univ Michigan. p. 558 Url

 —— (1997). The U.S. Navy: A History (3rd ed.),
 Naval Institute Press, Annapolis, MD . OCLC 37211290, Url

 Morgan, William James (1959). Captains to the northward: the New England captains in the Continental Navy,
 Barre Gazette; Original from Univ. Michigan press. p. 260 Url

 Paullin, Charles Oscar, (1906). The navy of the American Revolution: its administration, its policy and its achievements,
 The Burrows Brothers Co. / Republican Printing Co., Iowa. p. 549 E'book

 Phillips, Donald T. (2010). On the Wing of Speed: George Washington and the Battle of Yorktown, 
Published by author, p. 282, Url

 Silverstone, Paul (2012). The Sailing Navy, 1775–1854,  
CRC Press, p. 112, Url

 Smith, Philip Chadwick Foster (1976). Captain Samuel Tucker (1747-1833), Continental Navy 
Essex Institute, p. 115 Book (snippit view)

Stewart, Robert Armistead,  (1934). The History of Virginia's Navy of the RevolutionMitchell & Hotchkiss, Printers, p. 279, Url
 Stoddard, William Osborn  (1900). The Noank's log: a privateer of the revolution 
Lothrop Publishing Co., Boston, p. 337, Url

Stout, Neil R. (1962). The Royal Navy in American Waters, 1760-1775, Volume 2University of Wisconsin—Madison, p. 888, Url
—— (1973). The Royal Navy in America, 1760-1775: A Study of Enforcement of British Colonial Policy in the Era of the American RevolutionNaval Institute Press, Annapolis. p. 227, Url
Sutherland, Jonathan, (2005). African Americans at War: An Encyclopedia, 
ABC-CLIO, p.819, Url

 Volo, James M. (2008). Blue Water Patriots: The American Revolution Afloat,
 Rowman & Littlefield. p. 312.  Url

John Paul Jones

 Abbott, John S.C. (2009). Life of John Paul Jones,  
Applewood Books, MA., 367 pages, Book (par view)

 Barnes, John Sanford, (1911). The Logs of the Serapis - Alliance - Ariel, Under the Command of John Paul Jones, 1779-1780:...  Printed for Naval Historical Society by De Vinne press, New York, 138 pages, E'book
Boudriot, Jean (1987). John Paul Jones and the Bonhomme Richard: A Reconstruction of the Ship and an Account of the Battle With H.M.S. Serapis  Naval Institute Press, Annapolis, 127 pages, Book (snippit view)
 Brady, Cyrus Townsend (1906). Commodore Paul Jones,
 D. Appleton and Co., New York; original from Univ. California, 482 pages, E'book

 Brown, Charles Walter (1902). John Paul Jones of naval fame: a character of the revolution,
M. A. Donohue & co., 271 pages, E'book

 Bruce, Wallace (2002). John Paul Jones: Father of the United States Navy,
 Writer's Club Press, NE., 304 pages, Book (par view)

 Callo, Joseph (2011). John Paul Jones: America's First Sea Warrior,
 Naval Institute Press. 289 pages, Book (par view)

 Cooper, James Fenimore, (1843). John Paul Jones,
 G.R. Graham, 29 pages, Book (no view)

 De Koven, Regin, (2006). The Life And Letters Of John Paul Jones, V1,
 Kessinger Publishing, 520 pages, Url

 Feld, Jonathan (2017). John Paul Jones's Locker: The Mutinous Men of the Continental Ship Ranger and the Confinement of Lieutenant Thomas Simpson, Naval History and Heritage Command, 36 pages. , 
 Fink, Leo Gregory (1962). Barry or Jones, "Father of the United States Navy"; Historical Reconnaissance,
 Jefferies & Manz, Inc, Philadelphia, 554 pages, Url

 Haugen, Brenda (2005). John Paul Jones: Father Of The American Navy,
 Capstone / Compass Point Books, 112 pages. , Url

 Johnson, Gerald W. (2005). The First Captain: The Story of John Paul Jones,  
Kessinger Publishing, 320 pages, Url

 Jones, John Paul; Taylor, Janette (1890). (P) Life and correspondence of John Paul Jones: including his narrative of the campaign of the Liman,
 D. Fanshaw, New York, 555 pages,  Url

 Jones, John Paul;  Charles henry Lincoln, Ph.D. (Ed),( 1903) A calendar of John Paul Jones manuscripts in the Library of CongressLibrary of Congress; Manuscript Division, Govt. Print. Office, Washington, 316 pages, E'book
 Lardas, Mark (2012). Bonhomme Richard vs Serapis: Flamborough Head 1779,
 Osprey Publishing, 80 pages, Url

 Library of Congress, Manuscript Division (1903). A calendar of John Paul Jones manuscripts in the Library of Congress,
 Government Printing Office, DC., 316 pages, E'book

 Morison, Samuel Eliot (N) (1999).  John Paul Jones: A Sailor's Biography,
Naval Institute Press, 534 pages, Url

 Russell, Phillips (1927). John Paul Jones: Man of Action, Simon & Schuster, New York, 348 pages, Url
 Saunders, Robert L. (2009). John Paul Jones: Finding the Forgotten Patriot,
 Robert L. Saunders. 250 pages, Url

 Seawewll, Milly Elliot, (1893). Paul Jones,  
Appleton & Co., New York, 166 pages,  Url

 Seitz, Don Carlos, (1917). Paul Jones: his exploits in English seas during 1778-1780,  
E.P. Dutton and Company, New York, 327 pages, Url1

 Sherburne, John Henry  (1825). The Life of Paul Jones: From Original Documents in the Possession of John Henry Sherburne, John Murray, London, p. 320, E'book
 —— (1851). The life and character of John Paul Jones: a captain in the United States navy. During the revolutionary war,
 Adriance, Sherman & co., New York. p. 408, Url

 Sperry, Armstrong (1953). John Paul Jones: fighting sailorRandom House,  p. 180, Url
 Thomas, Evan (2004). John Paul Jones: Sailor, Hero, Father of the American Navy,
 Simon & Schuster, New York. p. 400, Url

 Thomson, Valentine (1942) John Paul Jones: father of the American navyWorld Publishers, p. 608, Url

John Barry

 Clark, William Bell (1938). Gallant John Barry 1745 1803 The Story Of A Naval Hero Of Two Wars,
 The Macmillan Company, New York. p. 554, E'book Book (par view 

 Cooper, James Fenimore (1843). John Paul Jones,
 G.R. Graham,  p. 29, Book (no view)

 Fink, Leo Gregory (1962). Barry or Jones, "Father of the United States Navy"; Historical Reconnaissance,
 Jefferies & Manz, Inc, Philadelphia. p. 138, Url

 Griffin, Martin Ignatius, Joseph (1897). The history of Commodore John Barry,
 Published by the Author, Philadelphia. p. 261,  E'book

 ——, Martin I J (2012). The Story of Commodore John Barry,
 Tredition Classics. p. 112,  Url

 Gurn, Joseph (1933). Commodore John Barry: father of the American navy,
 P.J. Kennedy & sons. p. 318, Url

 —— (1903). Commodore John Barry: "the father of the American navy",
 Published by the Author, Philadelphia. p. 424, E'book

 McGrath, Tim (2010). John Barry: An American Hero in the Age of Sail,
 AuthorHouse, IN., p. 704, Url

 Meany, William Barry (1911). Commodore John Barry, the father of the American navy: a survey of extraordinary episodes in his naval career,
 Harper & Brothers, New York, London. p. 74, Url

 Wibberley, Leonard (1957). John Barry: father of the Navy,
 Ariel Books. p. 157, Url

 Williams, Thomas (2008). America's First Flag Officer: Father of the American Navy,
 AuthorHouse, IN. p. 260, Url

Richard Dale

 Brady, Cyrus Townsend (1906). Commodore Paul Jones,
 D. Appleton and Co., New York; original from Univ. California. p. 482, E'book

 Cooper, James Fenimore (1842). Richard Dale,
 Publisher (1842). p. 297, Book (no view)

 —— (1856). History of the navy of the United States of America,
 Stringer & Townsend, New York. p. 508. OCLC = 197401914, E'book

 —— (1864).History of the Navy of the United States of America: Continued to 1860 ..., Volumes 1-3Blakeman & Mason, p. 634, E'book
 Fink, Leo Gregory (1962). Barry or Jones, "Father of the United States Navy"; Historical Reconnaissance,
 Jefferies & Manz, Inc, Philadelphia. p. 554, Url

 McKee, Christopher (1972). Edward Preble: a naval biography, 1761-1807,
United States Naval Institute, Annapolis, Maryland. p. 436, Url

 Morris, Charles (1907). Heroes of the navy in America,
 J.B. Lippincott company, Philadelphia and London, p. 312, Url

 Peterson, Charles Jacobs (1857). The American navy: being an authentic history of the United States navy ...
Jas. B. Smith & Co, Philadelphia. p. 545, Url

 Russell, Phillips (2004). John Paul Jones: Man of Action 
Simon and Schuster, New York. p. 348. , Url

 Sears, Robert (1855). The remarkable adventures of celebrated persons: ..., etc., eminent in the history of Europe and America,
Robert Sears, New York, p. 410, Url

Smith, Myron J. (1973). Navies in the American Revolution: a bibliographyScarecrow Press p. 219, Url
 Seawell, Molly Elliot (1897). Twelve naval captains: being a record of certain Americans who made themselves immortal,
Kegan, Paul, Trench, Trubner, & Co. Ltd, ltd., London, p. 233, Url

 Sweetman, Jack (2002). American Naval History: An Illustrated Chronology of the U.S. Navy and Marine Corps, 1775–present,
Naval Institute Press, Annapolis, MD:. . Url

 Thomas, Evan (2004). John Paul Jones: Sailor, Hero, Father of the American Navy ,
 Simon and Schuster, New York, p. 400, . Url

Other sources for Richard Dale can be found in bibliographies for:
John Paul Jones ~ John Barry ~  Stephen Decatur ~ Edward Preble

Thomas Truxtun ~ Silas Talbot

 Cooper, James Fenimore (1856). History of the Navy of the United States of America,
Stringer & Townsend, New York. p. 508. OCLC 197401914, E'book

 Eastman, Ralph M. (2004). Some Famous Privateers of New England,
Kessinger Publishing, p. 96, Book (no view)

 Ferguson, Eugene S  (1956). Truxtun of the Constellation: The Life of Commodore Thomas Truxtun, U.S. Navy, 1755-1822
Johns Hopkins University Press, p. 322, E'Book

 Fowler, William M.  (1995), Silas Talbot: Captain of Old Ironsides
Mystic Seaport Museum, p. 231, Book (snippit view)

 Grant, Bruce  (1960). Captain of the Constellation: Commodore Thomas Truxtun
Putnam, New York p. 123, Book (snippit view)

Loubat, Joseph Florimond (1881). The medallic history of the United States of America, 1776-1876, Volume 1
Published by author/Loubat, New York. p. 488, E'book

 McKee, Christopher  (1991). A Gentlemanly and Honorable Profession: The Creation of the U.S. Naval Officer Corps, 1794-1815
Naval Institute Press, p. 600, Book (par view)

 Schultz, Charles R.  (1965). P :  Inventory of the Silas Talbot Papers, 1767-1867,
Marine Historical Association, p.86, Url

 Statham, Edward Phillips  (1910). Privateers and privateering. With eight illustrations,
Hutchinson & co / James Pott & Co., New York, p. 382,  E'book

 Truxtun, Thomas (1809). P :  Biographical Memoirs of Thomas Truxtun, ESQ. from the Port Folio,  
Bradford & Inskeep, Book (no view)

 Tuckerman, Henry, (2009), The Life of Silas Talbot
Applewood Books, Bedford, Mass., p. 148, Book (par view)

Other sources for Thomas Truxtun and Silas Talbot can be found in bibliographies for:Stephen Decatur ~ Edward Preble ~ Richard Dale

Jefferson / Madison era

 Adams, Henry, (1889). P :  History of the United States of America, Volume 1,
Charles Scribner's Sons, New York, 451 pages, E'book

 —— (1890). History of the United States of America during the second administration of Thomas Jefferson, Volume 4,
Charles Scribner's Sons, New York, p. 502, E'book

 —— (1891), [1962]. History of the United States of America, Volume 9,
Charles Scribner's Sons, New York; Reprint: Antiquarian Press, 370 pages, E'book

 Canney, Donald L. (2001). Sailing warships of the US Navy,
Chatham Publishing / Naval Institute Press, 224 pages, Book (par view)

 Channing, Edward, (2004). The Jeffersonian System 1801 To 1811,
Kessinger Publishing. 324 pages, Book (no view)

 Dye, Ira (2006). Uriah Levy: Reformer of the Antebellum NavyUniversity Press of Florida, 299 pages, Book (no view)
 Foote, Andrew Hull, (1855). P :  African Squadron,
William F. Geddes, printer, Philadelphia, 15 pages, E'book
 Fremont-Barnes, Gregory (2006). The Wars of the Barbary Pirates: To the Shores of Tripoli - The Rise of the Us Navy and Marines, Osprey Publishing, 95 pages; ; Book
 Guttridge, Leonard F.Smith, Jay D., (1969). The commodores
Harper & Row, Original Univ. Michigan, 340 pages, Book (snippit view)

Hattendorf, John, B., (2011). Talking about Naval History: A Collection of Essays
Government Printing Office, 254 pages, Book (par view)

 Isenberg, Nancy; Burstein, Andrew, (2001). Madison and Jefferson,
 Random House Digital, Inc., 848 pages, Url

 Jefferson, Thomas, (1905). Ford, Paul Leicester. ed. P :  The works of Thomas Jefferson,
 G.P. Putnam's Sons, New York & London. 532 pages, E'book

 Ketcham, Ralph Louis (1971). James Madison: A Biography,
 University Press of Virginia. 751 pages, Book
 Leiner, Frederick C.  (2000). Millions for defense: the subscription warships of 1798, Naval Institute Press, 262 pages; Book
 Mapp, Alf J. (2009). Thomas Jefferson: Passionate Pilgrim, The Presidency, The Founding of the University, and the Private Battle,
 Rowman & Littlefield, Maryland, 445 pages, Book

 Mattern, David B., (2005). James Madison: patriot, politician, and president,
 ABC-CLIO. 112 pages, Book

 McCullough, David, (2005). 1776,
 Simon, Schuster, New York, N.Y., 400 pages, Book

 Merwin, Henry Childs, (1901). Thomas Jefferson,
 Houghton, Mifflin, 164 pages; E'book

 Nash, Howard P. (1968). The Forgotten Wars: The Role of the U.S. Navy in the Quasi War With France and the Barbary Wars, 1798-1805A. S. Barnes, New York, 308 pages; Book
 Ohls, Gary J., (2008). Roots of Tradition: Amphibious Warfare in the Early American Republic,
ProQuest, 372 pages, Book

 Palmer, Michael A. (1987). Stoddert's War: Naval Operations During the Quasi-War With France, 1798-1801 Univ. of South Carolina Press, Columbia, 313 pages, Book
 Peterson, Merrill D. (1986). Thomas Jefferson and the New Nation,
 Oxford University Press,548 pages, Book

 Randall, Willard Sterne, (1994). Thomas Jefferson: A Life,
 Harper Collins, 736 pages,  Book

 Rayner, B. L., (1832). Sketches of the life, writings, and opinions of Thomas Jefferson:  With selections of the most valuable portions of his voluminous and unrivaled private correspondence,
 A. Francis and W. Boardman, New York, 556 pages,  E'book

Richardson, James D., (2004). P :  Thomas Jefferson: A Compilation of the Messages and Papers of the Presidents
Kessinger Publishing, 184 pages, Url

Safire, William, (2008). Safire's Political Dictionary,
Oxford University Press, p.862, Book

Smith, Gene A., (1995). "For the Purposes of Defense": The Politics of the Jeffersonian Gunboat Program,
 University of Delaware Press, Newark, DE, 185 pages, Book

 Symonds, Craig L.;Clipson, William J. (2009). The Naval Institute Historical Atlas of the U.S. Navy,
 Naval Institute Press, 1101 pages, Book

 Tucker, George, (1837). The life of Thomas Jefferson, third president of the United States: ...,
 Charles Knight, London, 587 pages, E'book

 Tucker, Spencer C., (1993). The Jeffersonian Gunboat Navy 
University of South Carolina Press, 265 pages, Book

 ——; Reuter, Frank Theodore, (1996). The Jeffersonian gunboat navy  .  Injured honor: the Chesapeake-Leopard Affair, June 22, 1807,
  Naval Institute Press, 268 pages, Book

 Wills, Garry, (2002). James Madison: The American Presidents Series: The 4th President, 1809-1817
Times Books, New York, 208 pages, Book

 Zacks, Richard, (2005).  The Pirate Coast: Thomas Jefferson, the First Marines, and the Secret Mission of 1805,
Hyperion, 448 pages, Book (snippet view)
~

Stephen Decatur

 Abbot, Willis John, (1886). The Naval History of the United States,
Peter Fenelon Collier, New York, 434 pages, E'book

 Allen, Gardner Weld, (1905). Our Navy and the Barbary Corsairs,
 Houghton Mifflin & Co., Boston, New York & Chicago., 354 pages; E'book

  —— (1909). Our Naval War with France 
Houghton Mifflin & Co., Boston, New York and Chicago, 323 pages; E'book

 Allison, Robert J. (2005). Stephen Decatur American Naval Hero, 1779–1820,
 University of Massachusetts Press, 253 pages, Book (par view)

 Anthony, Irvin, (1931). Decatur,
Charles Scribner & Sons, New York, 319 pages; Book (snippit view)

 Birindelli, Ben (1998).  The 200 year legacy of Stephen Decatur, 1798-1998Hallmark Pub, 216 pages; ; Book (snippit view)
 Borneman, Walter R. (2004). 1812: The War that Forged a Nation,
 Harper Collins, New York, 349 pages, Book (par view)

 Bradford, James C. (1997). Quarterdeck and Bridge: Two Centuries of American Naval Leaders,
 Naval Institute Press, 455 pages; ; Book (par view)

 Brady, Cyrus Townsend (1900). Stephen Decatur,
Small, Maynard & Company, (original, Harvard Univ.), 142 pages; Book (no view)

  ——  (2006). Stephen Decatur,
Kessinger Publishing (reprint), 168 pages; ; Book (no view)

  Canney, Donald L. (2001). Sailing Warships of the US Navy,       
 Chatham Publishing / Naval Institute Press, 224 pages; ; Book (par view)

 Cooper, James Fenimore (1856). History of the Navy of the United States of America,   
Stringer & Townsend, New York, 508 pages; OCLC = 197401914; E'book

 —— (1846). Lives of distinguished American naval officers,
 Carey and Hart, Philadelphia. 436 pages; OCLC = 620356; E'book1 E'book2

 Decatur, Stephen; Barron, James (1820). P :  CORRESPONDENCE, BETWEEN THE LATE COMMODORE STEPHEN DECATUR AND COMMODORE JAMES BARRON ...,
Russell & Gardner, Boston, 22 pages; E'book1, E'book2

 De Kay, James T. De Kay, (2004), A Rage for Glory: The Life of Commodore Stephen Decatur, USN, Simon and Schuster, New York, 297 pages; ; Book (par view)
 Gleaves, Albert, (1904). James Lawrence, captain, United States Navy: commander of the "Chesapeake",
G.P. Putnam's Sons, New York, London, 335 pages; E'book

 Guttridge, Leonard F. (2005). Our Country, Right Or Wrong: The Life of Stephen Decatur,
 Tom Doherty Associates, LLC, New York, 304 pages;  Book (par view)

 Hagan, Kenneth J. (1992). This People's Navy: The Making of American Sea Power,
 The Free Press, New York, 468 pages; ; Book (par view)

 Hale, Edward Everett (1896). Illustrious Americans, Their Lives and Great Achievements,
International Publishing Company, Philadelphia and Chicago, 756 pages' ; Url1, Url2

 Harris, Gardner W. (1837) The Life and Services of Commodore William Bainbridge, United States Navy
Carey Lea & Blanchard, New York, 254 pages; E'book

 Hickey, Donald R. (1989). The War of 1812, A Forgotten Conflict,
University of Illinois Press. Chicago and Urbana, E'book

 Hill, Frederic Stanhope (1905). Twenty-six Historic Ships,
G.P. Putnam's Sons, New York & London, 515 pages; E'book

 Hollis, Ira N. (1900). The Frigate Constitution the Central Figure of the Navy Under Sail,
Houghton, Mifflin and Company, Boston and New York; The Riverside Press, Cambridge,455 pages; [*  E'book]

 Kimball, Horace (1858). The Naval Battles of the United States in the Different Wars with Foreign Nations, from the Commencement of the Revolution to the Present Time: Including PrivateeringHiggins, Bradley and Dayton, Boston, 278 pages; E'book
 Lambert, Andrew (2012). The Challenge. Britain against America in the Naval War of 1812,
Faber and Faber, London, Url

Lardas, Mark. (2011). Decatur's Bold and Daring Act, The 'Philadelphia' in Tripoli 1804. Osprey Raid Series #22. Osprey Publishing, 80 pages; ; Book (par view)
 Leiner, Frederic C. (2007). The End of Barbary Terror, America's 1815 War Against the Pirates of North Africa,
 Oxford University Press, 240 pages; ; Book (par view)

 Lewis, Charles Lee, (1924). Famous American Naval Officers,
 L.C.Page & Company, Inc., 444 pages; ; E'book

 —— (1937). The Romantic Decatur,
 Ayer Publishing, 296 pages; ; Book (no view)

 London, Joshua, (2005). Victory in Tripoli: How America's War with the Barbary Pirates Established the U.S. Navy and Shaped a Nation,
 John Wiley & Sons, 288 pages; ; Book (par view)

 Mackenzie, Alexander Slidell, (1846). Life of Stephen Decatur: A Commodore in the Navy of the United States,
 C. C. Little and J. Brown. p. 443. E'book

 Macdonough, Rodney (1909). Life of Commodore Thomas Macdonough,
U.S. Navy, Boston, MA: The Fort Hill Press. p. 303 E'book

 Maclay, Edgar Stanton (1894). A History of the United States Navy, from 1775 to 1893, 
D. Appleton & Company, New York. p. 647 E'book

 Morris, Charles (1907). Heroes of the navy in America,
J.B. Lippincott company, Philadelphia and London. p. 312 E'book

 Panzac, Daniel  (2005), The Barbary Corsairs: The End of a Legend, 1800–1820, K. Brill, Netherlands, p. 352, Url
   Roosevelt, Theodore (1882). The Naval War of 1812,
G.P. Putnam's Sons, New York. p. 541. E'book

 Seawell, Molly Elliot (1908.) Decatur and Somers,  
D.Appleton and Company, New York, p. 178, E'book

   Shaler, William; American Consul General at Algiers (1826). Sketches of Algiers 
Cummings, Hillard and Company, Boston. p. 296. E'book

 Smethurst, David  (2009).  Tripoli: The United States' First War on Terror,Random House LLC, p. 320, Book (par view)
   Smith, Charles Henry (1900). Stephen Decatur and the suppression of piracy in the Mediterranean: ...,  
Tuttle, Morehouse & Taylor, New Haven. p. 38 E'book

   Toll, Ian W. (2006) Six Frigates: The Epic History of the Founding of the U.S. Navy,
W. W. Norton & Company, New York. p. 592.  Url

   Tucker, Spencer (2004) Stephen Decatur: A Life Most Bold and Daring,
Naval Institute Press, Annapolis, MD. p. 245.  Book (par view)

  —— (2012) The Encyclopedia Of the War Of 1812,
 ABC-CLIO, 1034 pages; Url

   Waldo, Samuel Putnam (1821) The Life and Character of Stephen Decatur,
 P. B. Goodsell, Hartford, Conn., 312 pages. E'book

   Whipple, Addison Beecher Colvin (2001). To the Shores of Tripoli: The Birth of the U.S. Navy and Marines,
 Naval Institute Press, 357 pages; ; Url

Other sources for Stephen Decatur can be found in bibliographies for :General Naval history ~ War of 1812 ~ Edward Preble

Thomas Macdonough

 Skaggs, David Curtis (2003). Thomas Macdonough: Master of command in the early U.S. Navy,
 Naval Institute Press, Annapolis, MD. p. 257. ,  Url

 MacDonough, Rodney (1909). Life of Commodore Thomas Macdonough, U. S. Navy,
 The Fort Hill press, Boston, Mass, p. 303, E'Book

 Mahon, John H. (1972). The War of 1812
 Da Capo Press, in arrangement with University of Florida Press, 1972, p. 496. , Url

 Frost, John (1845). The pictorial book of the commodores: comprising lives of distinguished commanders in the navy of the United States
Nafis and Cornish, New York. p. 432, E'Book

 Holden, James A. (1914). The Centenary of the Battle of Plattsburg,
Univ. New York, Albany, NY, p.97, E'Book

Other sources for Thomas Macdonough can be found in bibliographies for:Stephen Decatur ~ War of 1812
~

John Rodgers

 Allen, By Gardner Weld (1909). Our naval war with France. Houghton Mifflin,
Boston, New York. p. 323, OCLC = 197401914, E'Book

 Cooper, James Fenimore (1826) History of the navy of the United States of America,
 Stringer & Townsend, New York. p. 508, OCLC = 197401914, Url

 McKee, Christopher (1972). Edward Preble: a naval biography, 1761-1807,
 United States Naval Institute, Annapolis, Maryland. p. 436, Book

 Paullin, Charles Oscar (1910). Commodore John Rodgers: Captain ...,
 The Arthur H. Clark Company, Cleveland, Ohio. p. 434, E'book

 —— (1968). Paullin's history of naval administration, 1775-1911: a collection of articles from the U.S. Naval Institute Proceedings,
 Annapolis MD: Naval Institute Press. p. 485, Book

 Schroeder, John H., (2006), Commodore John Rodgers: Paragon of the Early American Navy,
  University Press of Florida, p. 255, Url

 Skaggs, David Curtis (2006). Oliver Hazard Perry: honor, courage, and patriotism in the early U.S. Navy
 Naval Institute Press. p. 302,  Url

Other sources for John Rodgers can be found in bibliographies forStephen Decatur ~ War of 1812 ~ Edward Preble
~

Charles Stewart

 Allison, Robert J. (2005). Stephen Decatur American Naval Hero, 1779–1820
University of Massachusetts Press., p. 253,  Book (par view)

 Berube, Claude G.; Rodgaard, John A. (2005). A Call To The Sea: Captain Charles Stewart Of The USS Constitution,
  Potomac Books, Inc.. p. 301.  Book (par view)

 Brodine, Charles E., Jr.; Crawford, Michael J.; Hughes, Christine F. (2007). Ironsides! The Ship, the Men and the Wars of the USS Constitution.  Fireship Press. p. 286.  Book (par view)
 Humphreys, Asheton Y.; Martin, Tyrone G., (N), (2000). P :  The USS Constitution's finest fight, 1815: the journal of Acting Chaplain Assheton Humphreys, US Navy,
  Nautical & Aviation Pub. Co. of America. p. 103 Book (snippit view)

 Ignatius, Martin; Griffin, Joseph (1897). The history of Commodore John Barry,
 Published by the Author, Philadelphia. p. 261 E'book

 Martin, Tyrone G. (2003). A Most Fortunate Ship: A Narrative History of Old Ironsides,
 Naval Institute Press. p. 421.  Book (snippit view)

 Tucker, Spencer C. (2004). Stephen Decatur: a life most bold and daring,
 Naval Institute Press, 2004 Annapolis, MD. p. 245.  Book (par view)

 Whipple, Addison Beecher Colvin (2001). To the Shores of Tripoli: the birth of the U.S. Navy and Marines,
 Naval Institute Press, 2001. p. 296.  Book (par view)

 Rakestraw, J. (1851). An exposition of the African slave trade: from the year 1840, to 1850, inclusive, Volume 2.,
 Philadelphia Yearly Meeting of the Religious Society of Friends, ed., p. 160 E'book

Other sources for Charles Stewart can be found at:bibliography for Stephen Decatur
~

Edward Preble

Loubat, Joseph Florimond (1881), The medallic history of the United States of America, 1776-1876,
Published by the author, p. 448, E'book

 McBride, James, (1815), Naval biography: consisting of memoirs of the most distinguished officers of the American navy; to which is annexed the life of General Pike,
Morgan, Williams & co., Cincinnati, p. 296, E'book

 McKee, Christopher (1972). Edward Preble: a naval biography, 1761-1807.
United States Naval Institute, Annapolis, Maryland. p. 436, Book (par view)

 Pratt, Fletcher (1950). Preble's boys: Commodore Preble and the birth of American sea power,
Sloane; original: Univ. Michigan. p. 419, Book (snippit view)

 Preble, Edward, (1800), P :  Edward Preble Memorandum Book and U.S. Navy Regulations, 
Archived material: Maine Historical Society, Portland, Me,  Book (no view)

 Sabine, Lorenzo; Ellis, George E. (1847) Jared Sparks, editor Lives of Edward Preble and William Penn,
Little & Brown, Boston, p. 408, E'book

 Soley, James Russell (2010). Operations of the Mediterranean Squadron Under Commodore Edward Preble, In 1803-1804,
Kessinger Publishing. p. 54, Book (no view)

 Tucker, Glenn (1963). Dawn like thunder: the Barbary wars and the birth of the U. S. Navy,
Bobbs-Merrill; Original, Univ. Michigan, p. 487, Book (snippit view)

 Whipple, Addison Beecher Colvin (2001). To the Shores of Tripoli: The Birth of the U.S. Navy and Marines,
Naval Institute Press. p. 357, Book (par view)

Other sources for Edward Preble can be found at:bibliography for Stephen Decatur
~

William Bainbridge

 Url
 Barnes, James (1897). Commodore Bainbridge: from the gunroom to the quarter-deck,
D. Appleton and company. p. 168.  Url

 Dearborn, Henry Alexander Scammell  (2011). The Life of William Bainbridge, Esq of the United States Navy,
Kessinger Publishing,. p. 252 Url

 Harris, Thomas (1837). The life and services of Commodore William Bainbridge, United States Navy,
Carey Lea & Blanchard, Philadelphia. p. 254.  E'Book

Hickey, Donald R. (1989). The War of 1812, A Forgotten Conflict,
University of Illinois Press, Chicago and Urbana.  Url

 Long, David Foster (1981). Ready to hazard: a biography of Commodore William Bainbridge, 1774-1833,
University Press of New England. p. 359.  Url

 Williams, Thomas (2010). The American Spirit: The Story of Commodore William Phillip Bainbridge,
AuthorHouse. p. 408.  Url

Other sources for William Bainbridge can be found at:
bibliography for Stephen Decatur
~

Isaac Hull

 Allen, Gardner Weld (2010). P :  Commodore Hull: Papers of Isaac Hull, Commodore United States Navy,
Kessinger Publishing. p. 372.  Url1 Url2

 Enz, David Fitz Enz (2009). Old Ironsides: Eagle of the Sea: The Story of the USS Constitution,
Taylor Trade Publications. p. 304.  Url

 Grant, Bruce (1947). Isaac Hull, Captain of Old Ironsides:  the life and fighting times of Isaac Hull and the U.S. frigate Constitution,
 Pellegrini and Cudahy; Original from the University of Michigan. p. 416 Url

 Hollis, Ira N. (1900). The frigate Constitution the central figure of the Navy under sail,
Houghton, Mifflin and Company, Boston and New York; The Riverside Press, Cambridge. p. 263 E'Book

 Hull, Isaac, (N), (1929). P :  Commodore Hull: papers of Isaac Hull, commodore, United States navy,
The Boston Athenaeum,. p. 341 Url

 Maloney, Linda M. (1986). The captain from Connecticut: the life and naval times of Isaac Hull,
Northeastern University Press. p. 549.  Url

 Molloy, Leo Thomas (1964). Commodore Isaac Hull, U.S.N., his life and times,
Hull Book Fund. p. 244 Url

 Marquardt, Karl Heinz (2005). The 44-Gun Frigate USS Constitution: "Old Ironsides",
Naval Institute Press. p. 128.  Url

 Martin, Tyrone G. (2003). A Most Fortunate Ship: A Narrative History of Old Ironsides,
Naval Institute Press. p. 421.  Url

 Stevens, Benjamin F (2010). Isaac Hull and American Frigate Constitution,
BiblioBazaar (reprint). p. 24.  Url

Other sources for Isaac Hull can be found at:bibliography for Stephen Decatur

Top

War of 1812

 Barnes, James, (1896). Naval actions of the War of 1812 
Harper & Brothers, New York, p. 263 E'book

—— (1906). Yankee ships and Yankee sailors: tales of 1812
 Macmillan, London. p. 281  E'book

  Budiansky, Stephen. (2012). Perilous Fight: America's Intrepid War with Britain on the High Seas, 1812-1815
Vintage Books, New York, p. 448  Book (par view)

Burges, Tristam (2009). Battle of Lake Erie
Applewood Books, Bedford. p. 136, Book (par view)

 Byron, Gilbert (1964). The War of 1812 on the Chesapeake Bay
Maryland Historical Society, Baltimore, p. 94, Book (snippit view)

 Collins, Mark, Taylor, David A.; Brinkley, Douglas (2012). The War of 1812 and the Rise of the U.S. Navy
Natnl Geographic Books, p. 280, Book (snippit view)

 Coles, Harry, L. (1966). The War of 1812University of Chicago Press, p. 307, Book (par view)
 Cranwell, John P., Crane, William B. (1940). Men of Marque: A History of Private Armed Vessels Out of Baltimore During the War of 1812,
Norton, New York, p. 413, Book (snippit view)

 Crawford, Michael J. (Ed) (2002). The Naval War of 1812: A Documentary History, Vol. 3Department of the Navy, Naval Historical Center, Washington, p. 920, Book (no view)
 Cruikshank, E.A. (1924). The Contest for the Command of Lake Ontario in 1814,
 Ontario Historical Society Papers and Records, XXI, p. 61, Book (no view)

 Daughan, George C. (2011). 1812: The Navy's War,
Basic Books, New York, p. 491,  Book (par view)

Dickon, Chris (2008). The enduring journey of the USS Chesapeake: ...,
The Hickory Press, Charleston, SC. p. 157, Book (par view)

Dudley, William S.; Crawford, Michael J. (1985). Naval War of 1812, A Documentary History,
Government Printing Office. p. 772,  Book (par view)

Dye, Ira: The Fatal Cruise of the Argus: Two Captains in the War of 1812Naval Institute Press, 1994,  Book (par view)
 Eckert, Edward K. (1900), The Navy Department in the War of 1812University of Florida Press, p. 77, E'book
 Ellis, James H.  (2009). A Ruinous and Unhappy War: New England and the War of 1812,
Algora Publishing, p. 315, Book (par view)

Forester, Cecil Scott (1956). The age of fighting sail: the story of the naval War of 1812,
Doubleday, New York, p. 284, Book (snippit view)

 Gay, Martin and Kathlyn, (1995). War of 1812,
Lerner Publications, p.65, Book (par view)

 Greenblatt, Miriam; Bowman, John Stewart (2009). War of 1812,
Infobase Publishing, p. 166, Book (par view)

Harrison, Bird (1962). Navies in the Mountains: The Battles on the Waters of Lake Champlain and Lake George, 1609-1814,
Oxford University Press, p. 361, Book (snippit view)

 Healey, David (2005) 1812: Rediscovering Chesapeake Bay's Forgotten WarBella Rosa Books, p. 194, Book (no view)
Heidler, David Stephen (2004). Encyclopedia of the War of 1812,
Naval Institute Press, Annapolis, Md., p. 636,  Url

Hickey, Donald R. (1989). The War of 1812, A Forgotten Conflict,
University of Illinois Press, Chicago and Urbana, p. 467.  Url

—— (2006). Don't Give Up the Ship! Myths of the War of 1812,
Robin Brass Studio, Incorporated,. p. 430.  Url

 Hitsman, J. Mackay. (1965). The Incredible War of 1812: A Military HistoryToronto: Univ. of Toronto Press, p. 265, Book (snippit view)
 Homans, Benjamin (1833). The Military and Naval Magazine of the United States, Volumes 1-2Thompson and Homans, Washington, p. 393, E'Book
Ingersoll, Charles J. (1845). Historical sketch of the second war between the United States of America, and Great Britain,
Lea and Blanchard, Philadelphia. p. 496.  E'Book

 —— (1852). History of the Second War and Great Britain  Lippincott, Grambo & Co., Philadelphia, p. 406, Url
 James, William, (1816), Inquiry Into the Merits of the Principal Naval Actions, Between Great-Britain and the United States  Anthony H. Holland, Halifax, N.S., p. 102, E'Book, Pdf, Open Library
 —— (1817). A full and correct account of the chief naval occurrences of the late war between Great Britain and the United States of AmericaT. Egerton, Whitehall, London, p. 528, E'Book
Jenkins, Mark Collins; Taylor, David; Brinkley, Douglas (2012). The War of 1812 and the Rise of the U.S. Navy,
Natnl Geographic Books, p. 280.   Url

 Lambert, Andrew (2012).The Challenge: America Against Britain in the Naval War of 1812Faber & Faber Limited, London, p. 560, Url
Latimer, Jon (2004) 1812: War with America,
Harvard University Press, 2007. p. 637. , Book (par view)

 Lossing, Benson John (1869). The Pictorial Field-book of the War of 1812:...Harper & Brothers, New York p. 1054, E'Book
Mattern, David B. (2005) James Madison: patriot, politician, and president,
ABC-CLIO. p. 112 Url

 Mahan, Alfred Thayer (1905) Sea power in its relations to the War of 1812, Volume 1,
Little, Brown, and Company, Boston, p. 423, E'Book

Mahon, John K. (1991) The War of 1812,
Da Capo Press, p. 476.  Url

Malcomson, Robert (1998) Lords of the Lake:The Naval War on Lake Ontario 1812–1814
Robin Brass Studio, Toronto, Url

—— (2006). Historical dictionary of the War of 1812,
Scarecrow Press/Rowman & Littfield, Maryland, 1991. p. 701.  Url

—— (2008) Capital in Flames: The American Attack on York, 1813
Robin Brass Studio, Toronto, 

Mills, James Cooke (1913). Oliver Hazard Perry and the battle of Lake Erie,
John Phelps, Detroit. p. 284 E'Book

 Nardo, Don, (1999). The War of 1812,
Lucent Books, p. 128, Book (snippit view)

Paine, Ralph Delahaye (2010) [1920]. The fight for a free sea: a chronicle of the War of 1812,
Yale University Press, New Haven, 1920. p. 235.  Url

 Paullin, Charles Oscar (1918) The Battle of Lake Erie (a collection of documents, mainly those by Oliver Hazard Perry) 
The Raufin Club, Cleveland, Ohio, p.222, E'Book

 Peterson, Charles Jacobs, (1852), The military heroes of the War of 1812: with a narrative of the war,
J.B. Smith and Co, Philadelphia, p.208, E'Book

 Roosevelt, Theodore, (1883). The naval war of 1812,
G.P. Putnam's sons, New York, p. 541 E'book

—— (1901)  The naval operations of the war between Great Britain and the United States, 1812-1815
Little, Brown, and Company, Boston. p. 290 E'book Book2 Book3

 Skaggs, David Curtis; Cogar, William B., Ed. (1989) Joint Operations During the Detroit- Lake Erie Campaign, 1813. In New Interpretations in Naval History: Selected Papers From the Eighth Naval History Symposium, 121–138.
Naval Institute Press, Annapolis, p. 302 Url

 ——; Altoff, Gerard T. (2000). A Signal Victory: The Lake Erie Campaign, 1812-1813Naval Institute Press, p. 264, Url
 Skeen, Carl Edward (1999). Citizen Soldiers in the War of 1812University Press of Kentucky, p. 229, Book (par view)
 Soley, James Russell, (1887), The boys of 1812 and other naval heroes,
Estes and Lauriat, Boston, p. 338, Url

 Stacey, Charles Perry. (1963) Naval Power On The Lakes, 1812-1814.
In Philip P. Mason, ed. After Tippecanoe: Some Aspects of the War of 1812
UP, Michigan State pp 49–59 online version

 ——  The Ships of the British Squadron on Lake Ontario, 1812-14 (1953) Canadian Historical Review, XXXIV
Published by author, 1953 Url

Thomson, John L. (1817). Historical sketches of the late war, between the United States and Great Britain,
Thomas Desilver. p. 367 Url

 Tomlinson, Everett Titsworth, (1906). The war of 1812,
Silver, Burdett and Co, New York, p.200, E'Book

 Tucker, Spencer C., (2012). The Encyclopedia Of the War Of 1812 ABC-CLIO. p. 1034, Url
 Walker, Alexander, (1856), Jackson and New Orleans. An authentic narrative of the memorable achievements of the American army, under Andrew Jackson, before New Orleans, in the winter of 1814, '15J. C. Derby, p. 411, E'Book

Oliver Hazard Perry

 Barnes, James (1912). The hero of Erie: (Oliver Hazard Perry)
D. Appleton & Company, New York, London, p. 167,  E'book

 —— (1905) The Blockaders: And Other StoriesHarper & Brothers, New York, p. 202 E'book
 Dillon, Richard (1978). We have met the enemy: Oliver Hazard Perry, wilderness commodore,
McGraw-Hill. p. 231. , Url

 Dutton, Charles J. (2006). Oliver Hazard Perry,
Scholar's Bookshelf. p. 308. , Url

 Mackenzie, Alexander Slidell (1840). The life of Commodore Oliver Hazard Perry, Volume 1,
Harper & Brothers, New York. p. 443,  E'book

 —— (1910). Commodore Oliver Hazard Perry,
 D.M. MacLellan Book Company, New York, NY/Akron, OH. p. 443. , E'book

 Mills, James Cooke (1913). Oliver Hazard Perry and the battle of Lake Erie,
 John Phelps, Detroit. p. 284, E'Book

Niles, John Milton (1820). The Life of Oliver Hazard PerryWilliam S. Marsh, Hartford, p. 376, E'book
 Paullin, Charles Oscar (1918) P :  The battle of Lake Erie: a collection of documents, chiefly by Commodore Perry ...,
The Rowfant Club, Cleveland, Ohio. p. 222, E'book

Skaggs, David Curtis (2006) Oliver Hazard Perry: honor, courage, and patriotism in the early U.S. NavyNaval Institute Press p. 302 , Book (par view)

Other sources for Oliver Hazard Perry can be found at:Bibliography for War of 1812   ~ List of books about the War of 1812

~

Joshua Barney
 Adams, William Frederick, (2008). Commodore Joshua Barney (1912)
 Kessinger Publishing, p. 354, Book (no view)

 —— (2010). Commodore Joshua Barney (Volume 2);
Many Interesting Facts Connected with the Life of Commodore Joshua Barney, Hero of the United States Navy,
General Books, p. 68, Book (no view)

 Barney, Mary, (1832). P :  A biographical memoir of the late Commodore Joshua Barney: Gray and Bowen, Boston, p. 328, E'book
 Footner, Hulbert, (1940). Sailor of Fortune: The Life and Adventures of Commodore Barney, Usn,
Naval Institute Press, p. 323, Book (par view)

 Norton, Louis A., (2000). Joshua Barney: Hero of the Revolution and 1812,
Naval Institute Press, p. 227, Book (par view)

 Paine, Ralph D., (2010). Joshua Barney: A Forgotten Hero of Blue Water, Kessinger Publishing, p. 456, Book
  Weller, Michael Ignatius, (1911). Commodore Joshua Barney, the Hero of the Battle of Bladensburg:
Incidents of His Life Gleaned from Contemporaneous Sources, University of Minnesota, p. 117, Book (snippit view)
Other sources for Joshua Barney can be found at:  Bibliography for Continental Navy ~ Bibliography for War of 1812~

Matthew C. Perry

 Barr, Pat. (1967). The Coming of the Barbarians: The Opening of Japan to the West, 1853-1870,
 Dutton and Co., New York, p. 236, Book (snippit view)

 Barrows, Edward Morley (1935). The Great Commodore: The Exploits of Matthew Calbraith Perry,
 Bobbs-Merrill Company, New York, Indianapolis, p.397 ,  Book (no view)

 Bennett, Frank Marion; Weir, Robert (1896). The steam navy of the United States:
A history of the growth of the steam vessel of war in the U. S. Navy, and of the naval engineer corps,
Press of W. T. Nicholson, Pittsburgh. p. 953, E'book

 Griffis, William Elliot (1887). Matthew Calbraith Perry: a typical American naval officer,
 Cupples and Hurd, Boston. p. 459,  E'book

 Morison, Samuel Eliot, (1967),  "Old Bruin": Commodore Matthew C. Perry, 1794-1858: the American naval officer who helped found Liberia ..., (1900),
 Little, Brown, p. 482,  Book (snippit view)

 Perry, Matthew Calbraith, (1968). p :  The Japan Expedition, 1852-1854: the personal journal of Commodore Matthew C. Perry,
 Smithsonian Institution Press, p. 241, Url

 Schroeder, John H. (2001). Matthew Calbraith Perry,
 Naval Institute Press, p. 326, Book (par view)

 Taussig, J. K., U.S. Navy; Krout, Mary H. (1921). P :  United States Naval Institute Proceedings, Volume 47 "Perry's Expedition to Japan",
 United States Naval Institute. p. 2051, E'book

Other sources for Matthew C.  Perry can be found inbibliography for Mexican–American War / Texas Navy

~

Mexican–American War ~ Texas Navy

Bauer, K. Jack, (1969). Surfboats and Horse Marines: U.S. Naval Operations in the Mexican War, 1846-1848,
United States Naval Institute. p. 291 Book (snippit view)

 Brockmann, R. John, (2009).  Commodore Robert F. Stockton, 1795-1866: Protean Man for a Protean Nation, the only scholarly biography,
Cambria Press, Amherst, Massachusetts, p. 622, Book (par view)

 Douglas, Claude Leroy, (1936). Thunder on the gulf: or, The story of the Texas navy,
Publisher, p. 128, Book (snippit view)

 Dienst, Alex  (2007). The Texas Navy
Fireship Press,  p. 208, Book (par view)

 Fischer, Earnest G  (1900). Robert Potter: Founder of the Texas Navy,
Pelican Publishing Company Incorporated, p. 320, Book (no view)

 Francaviglia, Richard, From Sail to Steam; Four Centuries of Texas Maritime History,
University of Texas Press, Book (par view)

 Garrison, George P., Editor, (1910). The Quarterly of the Texas State Historical Association, Volume 13,
Texas State Historical Association, p. 344, E'book

 Hill, Jim Dan  (1987). The Texas Navy: in forgotten battles and shirtsleeve diplomacy,
State House Press, p. 224, Book (snippit view)

 Sam Houston, Moore, Edwin Ward, (1843). P :  To the People of Texas, p. 204, Book (no view)
Jordan, Jonathan (2006). Lone Star Navy: Texas, the Fight for the Gulf of Mexico, and the Shaping of the American West
Potomac Books, Washington, DC, p. 381, Book (snippit view)

Meed, Douglas (2001). The Fighting Texas Navy, 1832-1843,  Republic of Texas Press, Plano, TX, Book (no view)
 Sullivan, Roy F.  (2010). The Texas Navies,  AuthorHouse, Bloomington, IN, p. 176, Book (par view)
 United States (Government), Naval History Division, (1968), The Texas Navy, Volume 2; Volume 31,
U.S. Government Printing Office, p. 40, Book (snippit view)

 Wells, Tom Henderson (1988) Commodore Moore and the Texas Navy
University of Texas Press, Austin, TX, p.240 , Book (no view)

~

American Civil War

 Anderson, Bern  (1962). By Sea and by River: The Naval History of the Civil War
Da Capo Press, p. 303, Url

Ammen, Daniel (1883). The Navy in the Civil War
Charles Scribner's Sons, New York, p. 282, e'Book

 Arnold, James R.; Wiener, Roberta; (2011). American Civil War: The Essential Reference GuideABC-CLIO, p. 432, 9781598849059, Book (snippit view)
 Baldwin, John; Powers, Ron (2007). Last Flag Down: The Epic Journey of the Last Confederate WarshipCrown Publishers, New York, p. 368 , Book (par view)
 Bennett, Frank Marion; Weir, Robert (1896). The Steam Navy of the United States: A History of the Growth of the Steam Vessel of War in the U. S. Navy, and of the Naval Engineer CorpsWarren & Company; Press of W. T. Nicholson, Pittsburgh, p. 953, e'Book
 Bennett, Michael J. (2004). Union Jacks: Yankee Sailors in the Civil War
Univ of North Carolina Press, p. 337, Book (par view)

 Bigelow, John, (1888). France and the Confederate Navy, 1862-1868: an international episode, Volume 3,
Harper & Brothers, New York, p.247, e'Book

 Bostick, Douglas W. (2010). Charleston Under Siege: The Impregnable City
The History Press, Charleston, South Carolina, p. 158, Book (par view)

 Brennan, Patrick (1996). Secessionville: Assault on Charleston
Savas Publishing Company, Campbell, California,  p. 394, Book (par view)

 Burton, E. Milby (1982). The Siege of Charleston 1861–1865
University of South Carolina Press, Columbia, South Carolina, p.390, Book (par view)

 Butler, Lindley S. Butler (2000)  Pirates, Privateers, & Rebel Raiders of the Carolina Coast, UNC Press Books, p. 275 , Book (par view)
 Calore, Paul (2002). Naval Campaigns of the Civil War
McFarland, New York. p. 232, Book (par view)

 Campbell, R. Thomas (1996). Gray Thunder: Exploits of the Confederate States Navy
Burd Street Press, Shippensburg, Pennsylvania, Book (no view)

 —— (1996). Southern thunder: exploits of the Confederate States NavyBurd Street Press, p. 198, Book (snippit view)
 —— (1997). Fire and Thunder: Exploits of the Confederate States Navy
 Burd Street Press, Shippensburg, Pennsylvania, p. 294, Book (snippit view)

 —— (1997). Southern Fire: Exploits of the Confederate States Navy
 Burd Street Press, Shippensburg, Pennsylvania, p.263, Book (snippit view)

 —— (2011). Confederate Naval Forces on Western Waters: The Defense of the Mississippi River and Its Tributaries,
Jefferson, North Carolina: McFarland & Co., p.372 , Book (no view)

 —— (2008). P :  Voices of the Confederate Navy: Articles, Letters, Reports, and Reminiscences
McFarland & Co., p. 366, Book (par view)

 (Different authors for each chapter) (1885). THE CENTURY ILLUSTRATED MONTHLY MAGAZINE  F. Warne & Co., London, p. 960, E'book
 Conrad, James Lee (2003). Rebel Reefers: The Organization and Midshipmen of the Confederate States Naval Academy
Da Capo Press, New York, p. 214, Url

 Coombe, Jack D., (1999). Gunfire Around the Gulf: The Last Major Naval Campaign of the Civil War
Bantam Books, New York, p. 256, Url

 Coski, John M. (1996). Capital Navy: The Men, Ships, and Operations of the James River Squadron.
Campbell, California: Savas Woodbury Publishers, p.344, Url

 —— (2005). The Confederate Navy
 The Museum of the Confederacy, Richmond, Virginia, p.63, Url

 Cracknell, William H. (1973). United States Navy Monitors of the Civil War
 Profile Publications, Windsor, England, p. 24, Url

Daniels, Secretary of the Navy, Josephus; Marsh, Captain, U.S.Navy, C.C. (1921)
P :  Official records of the Union and Confederate navies in the War of the Rebellion
Government Printing Office, United States; Naval War Records Office, Office of Naval Records and Library, p. 980 , E'book

 
  247 pages.
 Donnelly, Ralph W.  (1989)  The Confederate States Marine Corps: the rebel leathernecks, White Mane Publishing Company, Incorporated, p. 337, Url
 Donovan, Frank Robert (1961). The Ironclads
Barnes publishing, p. 125 Book (snippit view)

 Durham, Roger S. (2005). High Seas and Yankee Gunboats: A Blockade-Running Adventure from the Diary of James Dickson,
Univ of South Carolina Press, p. 185, Url

 Eicher, David J.,  (1997). The Civil War in Books An Analytical Bibliography
University of Illinois Press, p. 407 excerpt and text search

 Elliott, Robert G. (1994 / 2005). Ironclad of the Roanoke: Gilbert Elliott's Albemarle White Mane Publishing Co., Shippensburg, Pennsylvania, p. 372, Url
 Field, Ron, (2008). Confederate Ironclad vs. Union Ironclad: Hampton Roads 1862
Osprey Publishing, United Kingdom, p. 80, Url

 Fowler, William M., (1990).  Under Two Flags: The American Navy in the Civil War
Naval Institute Press, p. 352, Url

 Fuller, Howard J. (2008). Clad in Iron – The American Civil War and the Challenge of British Naval Power |publisher=Naval Institute Press, Annapolis, Maryland, p. 409, Book
 Gibbons, Tony, (1989). Warships and naval battles of the Civil War
Gallery Books, p. 176, Url

 Gorgas, Josiah (1995). Sarah Woolfolk Wiggins. ed. P :  The Journals of Josiah Gorgas, 1857-1878
University of Alabama Press. p. 305,  Url

 Hearn, Chester G. (1992). Gray raiders of the sea: how eight Confederate warships destroyed the Union's high seas commerce
International Marine Pub., p. 351. , Url

 Holzer, Harold (2013). The Civil War in 50 ObjectsNew-York Historical Society, Penguin Books, p. 416, Book (par view)
 Johnson, John (1890). The Defense of Charleston HarborWalker, Evans & Cogswell Company, p. 276, E'book
 Johnson, Robert Underwood; Buel, Clarence Clough, (1887).  Battles and Leaders of the Civil War, Volume 1,
Century Company, New York, p. 750, E'book

 
 Konstam, Angus (2002).  (2001) Confederate Ironclad 1861-65Osprey Publishing, p. 48, Url
 —— (2002). Mississippi River Gunboats of the American Civil War 1861-65
Osprey Publishing, UK. p. 48. , Url

——; Bryan, Tony  (2002). Union River Ironclad 1861-65Osprey Publishing, p. 48, Url
——  (2002). Union Monitor 1861-65Osprey Publishing, p. 48, Url
——  (2002) Hampton Roads 1862: Clash of the IroncladsOsprey Publishing, p. 96, Url
——; Bryan, Tony (2003). Confederate Raider 1861-65Osprey Publishing, p. 48, Url
——; —— (2004). Confederate Submarines and Torpedo VesselsOsprey Publishing, p. 48, Url
Lambert, Andrew (1984). Battleships in Transition, the Creation of the Steam Battlefleet 1815-1860,
 Conway Maritime Press, .  

 Lardas, Mark  (2011).  CSS Alabama Vs USS Kearsarge: Cherbourg 1864Osprey Publishing, p. 80, Url
 Leckie, Robert (1990). None Died in Vain: The Saga of the American Civil WarHarper-Collins, New York, p. 682, Book
 Luraghi, Raimondo, (1996). A history of the Confederate Navy,
Naval Institute Press, p.514, Url

 MacBride, Robert (1962 / 2011). Civil War Ironclads: The Dawn of Naval ArmorLiterary Licensing, Philadelphia, p. 196, Url
 Mahan, Alfred Thayer, n (1883). The gulf and inland waters, Volume 3,
Charles Scribner, New York, p. 267, E'book

 —— (1907). P :  From sail to steam: recollections of naval life,
Harper & Brothers, New York, London, p. 325, E'book

  (Plain text format)
 
 McPherson, James M. (1988). Battle cry of FreedomOxford University Press, New York; p. 904, Book
Melton, Maurice (1968). The Confederate Ironclads
Thomas Yoseloff Ltd, South Brunswick, New Jersey, p. 319, 

 Merli, Frank J. (1970). Great Britain and the Confederate Navy, 1861-1865
Indiana University Press, Indiana. p. 342.  Url

 Merrill, James M. (1957). The Rebel Shore: the story of Union sea power in the Civil War
Little, Brown Publishing,  p. 246, E'Book

 Mokion, Arthur (1991). Ironclad: The Monitor & the Merrimack
Presidio Press, Novato, California, Url

 Morgan, Murray (1948). Confederate raider in the north Pacific:the saga of the C.S.S. Shenandoah, 1864-65Washington State University Press, p. 336, Url
 Musicant, Ivan. (1995). Divided Waters: The Naval History of the Civil War
HarperCollins Publishers, New York, p. 473, Book (snippit view)

 Nash, Howard Pervear (1972). A naval history of the Civil WarA. S. Barnes, p. 375, Url
 Oberholtzer, Ellis Paxson (1904) 
—— (1907). Financier of the Civil War, Volumes I and IIG.W. Jacobs & Company, Philadelphia, p. 658, E'book, vol.I
—— (1907). Financier of the Civil War, Volume IIG.W. Jacobs & Company, Philadelphia, p. 590, E'book, vol.II
 Olmstead, Edwin (1997). Stark, Wayne E., Tucker, Spencer C. The Big Guns: Civil War Siege, Seacoast and Naval Cannon,
Museum Restoration Service, p. 360, Url

 Page, David (2001). Ships Versus Shore: Civil War Engagements Along Southern Shores and RiversThomas Nelson Incorporated, p. 412, Url
 Pratt, Fletcher (1956). Civil War on Western WatersHenry Holt and Company, p. 255, Url.
  Porter David Dixon (1886). P :  The Naval History of the Civil War.
McFarland. p. 843, E'book

Quarstein, John V. (2006).  History of Ironclads: The Power of Iron Over WoodThe History Press, p. 284, Book
, E'book
 Rhodes, James Ford (1917). History of the Civil WarMacmillan & Co., New York, Boston, London, p. 467, E'book 
 Richter, William L. (2004).  Historical Dictionary of the Civil War and Reconstruction Scarecrow Press, Maryland, p. 968, Url
 Roberts, William H. (1999). USS New Ironsides in the Civil WarNaval Institute Press, Annapolis, Maryland , Book
 —— (2007). Civil War Ironclads: The U.S. Navy and Industrial Mobilization
The Johns Hopkins University Press, Baltimore, p. 300, Url

 Robinson, Charles M.  (1995).  Shark of the confederacy: the story of the CSS Alabama, Leo Cooper Publishers, p. 212, Url
 Robinson, William Morrison (1994).  The Confederate Privateers
Univ of South Carolina Press, p. 404, Url

 Rush Richard; Woods, Robert H. (N); (1895). Official Records of the Union and Confederate Navies in the War of the RebellionU.S. Government Printing Office, p. 922, E'book
 Schouler, James (1899). History of the civil war, 1861-1865: being vol. VI of History of the United States of America, under the constitutionDodd, Meade & Co., New York, p. 699, E'book 
 Shaw, David W. (2005). Sea Wolf of the Confederacy: The Daring Civil War Raids of Naval Lt. Charles W. ReadSheridan House, Inc, p. 256, Url
 Silverstone, Paul (1989). Warships of the Civil War Navies
Naval Institute Press, Annapolis, p. 288.  Url

 Smith, Myron J. (2010). Tinclads in the Civil War:  Union Light-Draught Gunboat Operations on Western Waters, 1862-1865
Osprey Publishing, UK. p. 423.  Url

—— (2008). The Timberclads in the Civil War: The Lexington, Conestoga and Tyler on the Western Waters
McFarland & Company, Inc., Jefferson, North Carolina, p. 552, Url

 Spencer, Warren F. (1997). The Confederate Navy in Europe
University of Alabama Press Press. p. 288, Url

 Stern, Philip Van Doren (1962). The Confederate Navy: A Pictorial History
Doubleday Books, p. 252, Url

 Still, Jr., William N. (2003). Confederate Shipbuilding,
University of South Carolina Press, Columbia, South Carolina, p. 110,  Url

 Symonds, Craig L. (1999). Confederate Admiral: The Life and Wars of Franklin BuchananNaval Institute Press, p. 274, Url
 Taafe, Stephen R. (2009). Commanding Lincoln's Navy: Union Naval Leadership During the Civil War
Naval Institute Press, Annapolis, Maryland, p. 324

 Tenney, W. J., (1867). The Military and Naval History of the Rebellion in the United States:, 
D. Appleton, New York, p. 843, Url

 Tucker, Spencer C. (2001). A Short History of the Civil War at Sea
SR Books, Wilmington, Delaware, Url

 —— (2006). Blue & gray navies: the Civil War afloat
 Naval Institute Press, Maryland. p. 426,  Url

 —— (2010). The Civil War Naval Encyclopedia, Volume 1
ABC-CLIO. p. 829.  Url

 —— (1988). Arming the Fleet. U.S. Ordnance in the Muzzle-Loading Era
Naval Institute Press, p. 308,  Url

 Turner, Maxine, (1999). Navy Gray: Engineering the Confederate Navy on the Chattahoochee and Apalachicola Rivers,
Mercer University Press, p.357, The+Confederate+Navy Url

 United States. Naval History Division, (1965).  Civil War naval chronology, 1861–1865, Volume 5U. S. Govt. Print. Off., p. 149, Url
 Varhola, Michael J. (1999). Everyday Life During the Civil WarWriter's Digest Books, 292 pages, Book (no view)
 Wagner, Margaret E.; McPherson, James M. (2006). The Library of Congress Civil War Desk Reference
Simon and Schuster Inc., New York, p. 976, Url1, Url2

 Ward, Geoffrey; Burns, Ric; Burns, Ken (1990) The Civil War: An Illustrated HistoryAlfred A. Knopf, New York; p. 426 , Book
 Watson, William (1893) The adventures of a blockade runner: or, Trade in time of war
T. Fisher Unwin, New York, 1893 / Texas A & M University Press, 2001. p. 324,  E'book Url2

, E'book
 Wilson, Walter E.; McKay, Gary L. (2012). James D. Bulloch: Secret Agent and Mastermind of the Confederate Navy
McFarland, North Carolina. p. 362.  Url

 Woodworth, Steven E. (1996). The American Civil War: A Handbook of Literature and Research
Greenwood Publishing Group. p. 754.  Url

Abraham Lincoln

Canney, Donald L. (1998). Lincoln's Navy: The Ships, Men and Organization, 1861-65,
Naval Institute Press. p. 232, Url

 Donald, David Herbert, (1996). Lincoln
Simon and Schuster, New York. p. 714. , Url

 Joiner, Gary D. (2007). Mr. Lincoln's Brown Water Navy: The Mississippi Squadron,
Rowman & Littlefield, Maryland. p. 199,  Url

 Sandburg Carl (1954). Abraham Lincoln,
Galahad Books, New York. p. 762. . Url

 Symonds, Craig L., (2008).  Lincoln and His Admirals
Oxford University Press. p. 448.  Url

 —— (2012). The Civil War at Sea
Oxford University Press. p. 256. , Url

 Weddle, Kevin J. (2005). Lincoln's Tragic Admiral: The Life of Samuel Francis Du Pont.
University of Virginia Press, p. 269, Url

 Welles, Gideon, n, (1911). P :  Diary of Gideon Welles, Secretary of the Navy Under Lincoln and Johnson, Volume 1,
Houghton Mifflin Co., Boston, New York; Original from Harvard University press. p. 553 E'book

 —— (1911). P :  Diary of Gideon Welles, Secretary of the Navy Under Lincoln and Johnson, Volume 2
Houghton Mifflin Co., Boston, New York; Original from Harvard University press. p. 659  E'Book

 —— (1911). P :  Diary of Gideon Welles, Secretary of the Navy Under Lincoln and Johnson, Volume 3
Houghton Mifflin Co., Boston, New York; Original from Harvard University press. p. 674  E'Book

Other sources for Abraham Lincoln can be found in:bibliography for American Civil War
~

David Farragut ~ David Porter

 Adelson, Bruce (2001). David Farragut: Union Admiral
Infobase Publishing p. 80. .  Url

 Anderson, Bern  (1962). By Sea and by River: The Naval History of the Civil War
Da Capo Press, p. 303, Url

 Barnes, James (1899). David G. Farragut
Small, Maynard & Company,  p. 132. .  Url

 —— (1909). Midshipman Farragut D. Appleton and Company, New York. p. 151. E'book
Duffy, James P. (1997). Lincoln's Admiral: the Civil War Campaigns of David Farragut.
Wiley, Url

 Farragut , Loyall (1879). The life of David Glasgow Farragut, first admiral of the United States navy:embodying his journal and letters.
D. Appleton and company, New York. p. 586.  E'book

 Foster, Leila Merrell (1991). David Glasgow Farragut: Courageous Navy CommanderChildren's Press, p. 107, Url
 Hearn, Chester G. (1995). The Capture of New Orleans 1862
Louisiana State University Press, Baton Rouge, Louisiana, p. 292 , Url

—— (1996). Admiral David Dixon Porter: the Civil War yearsNaval Institute Press, p. 376, Url
 Houston, Florence Amelia Wilson; Blaine, Laura Anna Cowan; Mellette, Ella Dunn (1916).Maxwell History and Genealogy: Including the Allied Families ...
Press of C.E. Pauley, Indianapolis Engraving Company. p. 642.  E'book

 Lewis, Charles Lee (1980). David Glasgow FarragutAyer Company Publishers, Url
 Long, David Foster (1970). Nothing too daring: a biography of Commodore David Porter, 1780-1843
U.S. Naval Institute. p. 396. . Url

 Mahan, Alfred Thayer, (1892). Admiral Farragut
D. Appleton and company, New York. p. 333. E'book

 Martin, Christopher (1970). Damn the torpedoes!: the story of America's first admiral: David Glasgow FarragutAbelard-Schuman, p. 280, Url
 Optic, Oliver (1891). Brave Old Salt: or, Life on the quarter deck. A story of the great rebellion
Lothrop, Lee and Shepard Co., Boston. p. 326. E'book

 Porter, David Dixon (1875). P :  Memoir of Commodore David Porter: of the United States NavyJ. Munsel, publishers, New York, p. 427, E'book
 Shorto, Russell (1991). David Farragut and the Great Naval Blockade
Silver Burdett Press. p. 128. .  Url

 Soley, Russell, James, (1903). Admiral Porter
D. Appleton, New York. p. 499. E'book

 Spears, John Randolph (1905). David G. Farragut
G.W. Jacobs, Philadelphia. p. 407.  E'book

 Stein, R. Conrad (2005). David Farragut: first admiral of the U.S. Navy
 Chelsea House Publishers. p. 40. . Url

 Turnbull, Archibald Douglas (1929). Commodore David Porter, 1780-1843:
Century Company. p. 324.  Url

 Wheeler, Richard (1969). In pirate waters
Rowell, 1969. p. 191.  Url

Other sources for David Farragut and David Porter can be found inbibliography for American Civil War
~

Union blockade ~ Blockade running

 Bennett, Frank M. (1897). The steam navy of the United States:.
Warren & Company Publishers Philadelphia. p. 502. , E'book Url2

 Bennett, Michael J. (2004). Union Jacks: Yankee Sailors in the Civil War,
Univ of North Carolina Press, p. 337, Url

 Browning, Robert M., Jr. (2002). Success Is All That Was Expected: The South Atlantic Blockading Squadron During the Civil WarBrassey's, Incorporated, p. 497, Book (snippit view)
—— (1993). From Cape Charles to Cape Fear. The North Atlantic Blockading Squadron during the Civil War,
University of Alabama Press. p. 472. , Url
 
 Buker, George E. (1993). Blockaders, Refugees & Contrabands: Civil War on Florida's Gulf Coast, 1861-1865,
University of Alabama Press, Tuscaloosa, Alabama, p. 235, Url

 Bulloch, James Dunwody, (1884). P :  The secret service of the Confederate States in Europe, or How the Confederate cruisers were equipped,
G.P. Putnam's Sons, New York, p. 460, Url

  Carr, Dawson (1988). Gray Phantoms of the Cape Fear: Running the Civil War BlockadeJohn F. Blair, Publisher, p. 227, Book (par view)
Cochran, Hamilton (1958). Blockade runners of the Confederacy,
Bobbs-Merrill; Original, Univ. California, p. 350, Url

 Dept U.S. Navy, SHIPS of the CONFEDERATE STATES.
DEPARTMENT OF THE NAVY—NAVAL HISTORICAL CENTER.

Calore, Paul (2002). Naval Campaigns of the Civil War
McFarland, p. 232, Url

Canney, Donald L. (1998). Lincoln's Navy: The Ships, Men and Organization, 1861-65
 Naval Institute Press, p. 232, Url

Confederate Congress, 1861-1865 (1905). Journal of the Congress of the Confederate States of America, 1861-1865
U.S. Government Printing Office, Washington. p. 917, Url

Cooper, William J. (2001). Jefferson Davis, American
Random House Digital, Inc. p. 848. , Url

 Coulter, Ellis Merton, (1994, 7th printing) [1950]. The Confederate States of America, 1861-1865,
Louisiana State University Press. p. 644. , Url

 Daugherty, Kevin. (2010). Strangling the Confederacy: Coastal Operations in the American Civil War,
Casemate Publishers, p. 233, Url

 Donald, David Herbert, (1996). Lincoln,
 Simon and Schuster, New York. p. 714. , Url

Evans, Clement Anselm (1899). Confederate military history: a library of Confederate States history, Volume 12 Confederate publishing company. p. 403, Url
Frajola, Richard (2011). "Tales from the Blockade",
Richard Frajola. p. 16, Retrieved 5 May 2012.

 Gorgas, Josiah (1995). Sarah Woolfolk Wiggins. ed. P :  The Journals of Josiah Gorgas, 1857-1878,
 University of Alabama Press. p. 305, Url

 Graham, Eric J. (2006). Clyde built: blockade runners, cruisers and armoured rams of the American Civil War,
Birlinn, UK p. 238, Url

Heidler, David Stephen & Jeanne T.; Coles, David J. (2002). Encyclopedia of the American Civil War: A Political, Social, and Military History,
W. W. Norton & Company, New York. p. 2733, . Url

 Hosmer, James Kendall (1913). The American civil war, Volume 2
Harper & Brothers Publishers, New York, London. p. 351, Url1

 Jones, Virgil Carrington (1960). The Blockaders: January 1861 - March 1862
Holt, Rinehart, Winston, p. 483, Url

Jones, Howard (1992) Union in Peril: The Crisis Over British Intervention in the Civil War,
University of North Carolina Press Press. p. 300, Url

Katcher, Philip R. N. (2003). The Army of Northern Virginia: Lee's Army in the American Civil War, 1861-1865,
Fitzroy Dearborn, New York. p. 352,  Url

Konstam, Angus; Bryan, Tony (2004). Confederate Blockade Runner 1861-65
Osprey Publishing, Wisconsin. p. 48, Url

MacDonald, John (2009). The Historical Atlas of the Civil War,
Chartwell Books, New York. p. 400, . Url

McNeil, Jim (2003). Masters of the Shoals: Tales of the Cape Fear Pilots Who Ran the Union Blockade,
 Da Capo Press. p. 188. . Url

Merli, Frank J. (1970). Great Britain and the Confederate Navy, 1861-1865,
Indiana University Press, Indiana. p. 342. . Url

Peters, Thelma Peterson (1939). The Bahamas and Blockade-running During the American Civil War,
 Duke University, North Carolina. p. 145, Url Url2

 Sandburg Carl (1954). Abraham Lincoln,
Galahad Books, New York, p. 762. , Url

 Scharf, John Thomas n (1894). P :  History of the Confederate States navy from its organization to the surrender of its last vessel,
Joseph McDonough, Albany, N.Y.. p. 824, . E'Book OpenLibrary

 Semmes, Raphael, n (1864). P :  The Cruise of the Alabama and the Sumter,
Digital Scanning, Inc., Mass. p. 348. ,  Url

—— (1869). P :  Memoirs of service afloat: during the war between the states,
  Kelly, Piet & Co., Baltimore. p. 833, E'Book

Shingleton, Royce (1979). John Taylor Wood: Sea Ghost of the ConfederacyUniversity of Georgia Press, p. 242, Book (no view)
—— (1994). High Seas Confederate: The Life and Times of John Newland Maffitt,
 University of South Carolina Press. p. 160,  Url

 Soley, James Russell (1885). The Blockade And The Cruisers,
  Digital Scanning Inc. p. 276. , Book (par view)

Spencer, Warren F. (1997). The Confederate Navy in Europe,
 University of Alabama Press Press. p. 288, Url

Stark, James H. (1891). Stark's history and guide to the Bahama Islands,
Duke University, North Carolina. p. 243 Url

Still, Jr., William N. (1997). The Confederate Navy: the ships, men and organization, 1861-65Conway Maritime Press, p. 262, Url
Still, Jr., William N. (1988). Iron AfloatUniv of South Carolina Press, p. 276, Par'View
 ——; Taylor, John M., Delaney Norman C.  (1998).Raiders & Blockaders: The American Civil War Afloat,
Brassey's Inc., Washington, D.C, p. 263, Url

Tans, Jochem H. (1995). The Hapless Anaconda: Union Blockade 1861-1865,
 The Concord Review, Inc.. p. 30. Url

U.S.Congress, 1893-1894 (1895). Congressional edition, Volume 3267, Issue 1,
 U.S. Government Printing Office, Washington. p. 989, Url

 Trotter, William R. (1989)   Ironclads and Columbiads: The CoastJohn F. Blair Publisher, p. 456, Book
Wagner, Margaret E.; McPherson, James M., (2006). The Library of Congress Civil War Desk Reference,
 Simon and Schuster Inc., New York, p. 976. ,  Url1, Url2

Walske, Steve, (2011). Civil War Blockade Mail: 1861 - 1865,
Steve Walske Exhibition at WESTPEX 2011. p. 32, Url

Wilkinson, John (1877). P :  The Narrative of a Blockade-Runner,
 Sheldon & Company, New York. p. 252, Url1, Url2

 Wilson, Walter E.; Mckay, Gary L. (2012) James D. Bulloch: Secret Agent and Mastermind of the Confederate NavyMcFarland & Company, North Carolina, p. 362, Url
Wise, Stephen R., (1991). Lifeline of the Confederacy: Blockade Running During the Civil War,
Univ of South Carolina Press. p. 403, Url

 ——  (1994).  Gate of Hell: Campaign for Charleston, 1863,  
Univ of South Carolina Press, p. 312, Url

Woods, Robert H.; Rush, Richard, Lieut. Commander, U.S.Navy, n (1896). P :  Official records of the Union and Confederate navies in the War of the Rebellion,
Government Printing Office, United States. Naval War Records Office, United States, under the direction of Hon. H.A. Herbert, Secretary of the Navy Office of Naval Records and Library. p. 276,  Url

Wyllie, Arthur (2007). The Union Navy,
 Lulu .com. p. 668, Url1

—— (2007). Confederate Officers,
Lulu.com. p. 580. , Url1

—— (2007). The Confederate States Navy,
 Lulu.com. p. 466 , Url1, Url2

 For general reference to the American Civil War see also: Bibliography of the American Civil War

See also : Blockade runners of the American Civil War

USS Monitor ~ CSS Virginia
 Baxter, James Phinney (1968). The introduction of the ironclad warship,
Archon Books, p. 398, Book (snippit view)

 Bennett, Lieutenant, U.S. Navy, Frank M. (1900). The Monitor and the Navy under steamHoughton, Mifflin and Company, Boston and New York, p. 369, E'book
 Besse, Summer B. (1937). The C.S. Ironclad Virginia: With Data and References for a Scale Model,
Newport News, Virginia, p. 47, Book (snippit view)

 Bradford, James C.  (1986). Captains of the Old Steam Navy: Makers of the American Tradition, 1840-1880Naval Institute Press, p. 356, Book
Broadwater, John D. (2012). USS Monitor: A Historic Ship Completes Its Final VoyageTexas A&M University Press, p. 239, Book (par view)
Brooke, John Mercer (1891).  P : The Virginia, or Merrimac: her real projectorW.E. Jones, book and job printer, p. 34, E'book
—— (2002). P :  Ironclads and Big Guns of the Confederacy: The Journal and Letters of John M. BrookeUniv of South Carolina Press, p. 257 , Book (par view)
Burnett, Constance Buel (1960). Captain John Ericsson: father of the MonitorVanguard Press, New York, p. 255, Book (snippit view)
 Bushnell, Cornelius Scranton; Ericsson, John; Well, Gideon (1899). P :  The original United States warship "Monitor"National Memorial Association, New Haven, Conn.,  p. 50, E'book
 Campbell, R. Thomas; Flanders, Alan B. (2001) Confederate Phoenix: The Css VirginiaBurd Street Press, p. 272, Book (snippit view)
Church, William Conant (1911). The Life of John EricssonCharles Scribner, New York, p. 660, E'book

Clancy, Paul (2013). Ironclad; The Epic Battle, Calamitous Loss, and Historic Recovery of the USS MonitorKoehler Books, New York, p. 340, Book (par view)
 Coombe, Jack (2008). Gunsmoke Over the Atlantic: First Naval Actions of the Civil WarRandom House LLC, p. 288, Book (par view)
Dahlgren, Madeleine Vinton (1882). P : Memoir of John A. Dahlgren, Rear-admiral United States NavyJ. R. Osgood, p. 660, E'book
 Davis, William C.(1982). The deep waters of the proudDoubleday Press, p. 316, Book (snippit view)
 —— (2012). Duel Between the First IroncladsRandom House Digital, Inc., p. 201, (snippit view)
De Kay, James Tertius (1998) Monitor: The Story of the Legendary Civil War Ironclad and the Man Whose Invention Changed the Course of HistoryG.K. Hall, p. 226, Book (Snippit view)
 Field, Ron (2011). Confederate Ironclad vs Union Ironclad: Hampton Roads 1862Osprey Publishing, p. 80, Book (par view)
Gentile, Gary (1993). Ironclad Legacy: Battles of the USS MonitorGary Gentile Productions, 280 pages, Book (snippit view)
 Hoehling, Adolph A.' (1993). Thunder at Hampton RoadsDa Capo Press, p. 231, Book (par view)

 Holzer, Harold; Mulligan, Tim (2006). The Battle of Hampton Roads: New Perspectives on the USS Monitor and CSS VirginiaFordham University Press, New York, Book (par view)
 Jones, Virgil Carrington (1962). The Civil War at sea: The final effort, July 1863-November 1865, Volume 3Holt, Rinehart, Winston, p. 460, Book (snippit view)
Konstam, Angus (2002). Hampton Roads 1862: First Clash of the IroncladsOsprey Publishing,  p. 96, Book (par view)

 McCordock, Robert Stanley (1938). The Yankee cheese boxDorrance, p. 470, Book (snippit view)
 Mindell, David A. (2000). War, Technology, and Experience Aboard the USS MonitorJHU Press, p. 187, Book (par view)
 —— (2012)  Iron Coffin: War, Technology, and Experience aboard the USS MonitorJHU Press, p. 208, Book (par view)
 Mokin, Arthur (1991). Ironclad: the Monitor and the MerrimackPresidio Press, p. 274, Book (snippit view)
 Nelson, James L. (2009). Reign of Iron:The Story of the First Battling Ironclads, the Monitor and the Merrimack.
 Harper - Collins, New York. p. 400, Book (par view)

 Norris, William (1879). The Story of the Confederate States' Ship "Virginia" (once Merrimac): Her Victory Over the Monitor ...1862John B. Piet, Publisher, p. 29, E'book
, Book (par view)

Quarstein, John V. (2012). CSS Virginia: Sink Before SurrenderThe History Press, p. 591, (par view)
—— (2010). The Monitor Boys: The Crew of the Union's First IroncladThe History Press, p. 349, Book (par view)
—— (2006). A History of Ironclads: The Power of Iron Over WoodThe History Press, p. 284, Book (par view)
—— (2000). C.S.S. Virginia, Mistress of Hampton RoadsSelf-published for the Virginia Civil War Battles and Leaders Series. , Book (par view)
 —— (1999). The Battle of the IroncladsArcadia Publishing, p. 128, Book (par view)
 —— (1997). The Civil War On The Virginia PeninsulaArcadia Publishing, p. 128, Book (par view)
, E'book
Sheridan, Robert E. (2004). Iron from the Deep: The Discovery and Recovery of the USS MonitorNaval Institute Press, p. 261, Book (par view)
  
 Still, William N.; Hill, Dina B. (1988). Ironclad Captains: The Commanding Officers of the U. S. S. MonitorNational Oceanic and Atmospheric Administration, U.S. Government Printing Office, Washington, D.C., p. 83, E'book
 Thompson, Stephen C. (1990). The Design and Construction of the USS Monitor (journal: Warship International, volume=XXVII, issue 3, pp.222-242)International Naval Research Organization, Toledo, Ohio, 
, Book (par view)
 Tindall, William (1923). The True Story of the Virginia and the Monitor: The Account of an Eye-witnessOld Dominion Press, Incorporated, p. 90, Book (par view)
 White, William Chapman; White, Ruth Morris (1957). Tin can on a shingleDutton Publishers, p. 176 pages, Book
, E'book

Spanish–American War ~ George Dewey

 Alger, Russell Alexander, (1901). N. The Spanish–American War 
BiblioBazaar. p. 465.  Book (par view)

 Alvarez, Jose M., (1991).  The Spanish–American War: An Annotated Bibliography  
U.S. Army War College. Book (no view)

 Chadwick, French Ensor,  (1911). N The relations of the United States and Spain: the Spanish–American War, Volume 1,
Charles Scribner's Sons, New York p. 412, E'book

 Clemens, William Montgomery, (1899). Life of Admiral George Dewey, Volume 20,
Street & Smith, New York. p. 196 Url

 Dewey, George (1913).P :  Autobiography of George Dewey: Admiral of the navy,
Charles Scribner, New York. p. 337.  Url

 Lawrence, William J. Lawrence (2010). A Concise Life of Admiral George Dewey, U S N 
BiblioBazaar, p. 72.  Url

 Mahan, Alfred Thayer (1899). Lessons of the war with Spain: and other articles,
Little, Brown Low, Boston, p. 320, Url

 Palmer, Frederick (1899). George Dewey, Admiral: impressions of Dewey and the Olympia on their homeward progress from Manila,
 Doubleday & McClure co., New York. p. 217 Url

 Paterson, Thomas G. (1998). U.S. Intervention in Cuba, 1898: Interpreting the Spanish–American–Cuban–Filipino War, 
Magazine of History, Vol. 12, No. 3, The War of 1898 (Spring, 1998), p. 5–10 Organization of American Historians. p. 10 Url

 Spector, Ronald H. (1974). Admiral of the new empire: the life and career of George Dewey 
Louisiana State University Press. p. 220, Url

 Tucker, Spencer, (2009). The Encyclopedia of the Spanish–American and Philippine–American Wars: A Political, Social, and Military History, Volume 1 
ABC-CLIO,. p. 993. , Url

 West, Richard Sedgewick (1948). Admirals of American empire: the combined story of George Dewey, Alfred Thayer Mahan, Winfield Scott Schley and William Thomas SampsonBobbs,
Merrill Co; Original, University of Michigan. p. 354,  Url

Other naval history
 Allen, Gardner Weld (1929). Our Navy and the West Indian PiratesEssex Institute, p. 107, Book (snippit view)
 Boot, Max (2007). The Savage Wars Of Peace: Small Wars And The Rise Of American PowerBasic Books, p. 728, Book (no view)
Bradlee, Francis Boardman Crowninshield (1923). Piracy in the West Indies and Its SuppressionEssex Institute, p. 220, Book (snippit view)
  Url
  Url
 Exquemelin, Alexandre Olivier; Ringrose, Basil  (1893).  The buccaneers of AmericaS. Sonnenschein & co., London, p. 508, E'book
  E'book
Konstam, Angus (2007). Predators of the SeasSkyhorse Publishing Inc., p. 240, Url
 Footner, Geoffrey Marsh (2003). USS Constellation: From Frigate to Sloop of WarNaval Institute Press, p. 367, Url
 Gardiner, Robert, (2006).   "Frigates of the Napoleonic Wars",Naval Institute Press, p. 208, Url
  E'book
  E'book

See also

Bibliography of 18th-19th century Royal Naval history
List of naval battles in the American Revolution
List of ships captured in the 18th century
List of ships captured in the 19th century
List of sea captains
List of single-ship actions
List of United States state navies in the American Revolutionary War
Glossary of nautical terms

Notes

External links
 United States Naval History: A Bibliography

United States naval history
Works about the United States Navy
United States